= Mike Collins (comics) =

English comic artist, writer since mid-1980s

Mike Collins is an English comic book artist and writer who has worked in the comics industry since the mid-1980s. He's worked on projects by major comic book studios such as Marvel Comics and DC Comics.

== Biography ==
Collins moved to Wales from London in 1985, switching career from law, to illustrate comics full time. He married Karen Collins and they have three daughters, and a granddaughter. Collins currently lives in Cardiff. He is the grandson of Military Medal-winning World War I soldier Thomas Guinane.

=== UK comics ===
In the mid-to-late 1980s, Collins wrote and drew strips for Marvel Comics United Kingdom division, amongst them; Spider-Man, Transformers, Doctor Who, and Zoids. He also worked on the celebrated UK weekly comic 2000 AD drawing Judge Dredd, Sláine and Rogue Trooper, as well as writing various Future Shocks. Collins illustrated the six-issue limited series Laser Eraser and Pressbutton for Eclipse Comics, illustrating the work of Pedro Henry (aka Steve Moore). He also did the art for a number of Axel Pressbutton stories which ran in Eclipse's Miracleman series.

=== US comics ===
He was hired in the 'Second Wave' of British artists lured to the United States in the late 1980s. Through the 1990s, he worked primarily for DC Comics on their key titles – Batman, Superman, Flash, Teen Titans, Wonder Woman, and the Justice League.

He also drew a series of licensed comics for the company, using various TSR, Inc./Dungeons & Dragons characters. A brief spell at Marvel saw Collins working on Uncanny X-Men (Key issue: #266, the first appearance of Gambit). He was back to DC though, to write and draw Peter Cannon, Thunderbolt, a revival of a 1960s Charlton Comics character.

Collins is primarily known for his work on TV and movie tie-in comics- for both Marvel and DC he has written and drawn Star Trek comics. In the late 1990s, he drew a Babylon 5 mini-series, "In Valen's Name", written by series creator J. Michael Straczynski and Peter David. A departure from most tie-in productions in that it actually serves as series 'canon' being based on an unused 3rd season script.

=== Current work ===
Currently Collins is the artist and writer for Panini Comics' Doctor Who Magazine. His main strip is the longest uninterrupted run as artist in the magazine.

Collins also wrote and drew a strip for the Weekly World News, as well as co-creating the series American Gothic with Ian Edginton for 2000 AD.

Outside of comics Collins has painted covers to a monthly series of downloadable Star Trek novels, the Starfleet Corps of Engineers, and works as a storyboard artist for both animation and live-action TV and movies.

Major work recently published is a 135-page adaptation of Charles Dickens' A Christmas Carol for Classical Comics. His regular Doctor Who collaborators, inker David Roach and colour artist James Offredi, worked with him on the book, with the script writer being Sean Michael Wilson. The graphic novel was chosen as one of the Top Ten Graphic Novels of the year by The Sunday Times and has gone on to sell well across by the UK and US, with several foreign language versions also coming out.

For BBC Books he illustrated The Only Good Dalek — the first graphic novel from the publisher, written by longtime Doctor Who author Justin Richards, and a sequel/prequel to the TV episode "Victory of the Daleks," The Dalek Project.

=== Unusual and unique work ===
He wrote and designed the first Welsh language graphic novel – Mabinogi in association with Cartwyn Cymru in 2001, and is the first UK artist to produce a series of graphic novels for Norway with Gunnar Staalesen, featuring his celebrated private eye, Varg Veum.

He works as a key illustrator for Welsh language school books using the comic strip medium, aimed at reluctant learners.

He supplied art for a number of cards in the Harry Potter Trading Card Game.

=== Film and TV ===
As well as comics work, Collins is a storyboard artist for children's TV shows, primarily the BAFTA winning Hana's Helpline, and live-action film. He also storyboarded on the film Ultramarines: A Warhammer 40,000 Movie and on the television shows Doctor Who, The Witcher and Sex Education.

== Bibliography ==
- Captain Britain
  - Sid's Story" script by Collins with art by Alan Davis (Captain Britain #4, April 1985)
  - "City," text story by Collins with illustrations by Collins and Mark Farmer (Captain Britain #5—7, May—July 1985)
  - "The Cheribum," script and pencils, with inks by Mark Farmer (Captain Britain #11—14, November 1985—February 1986)
- Axel Pressbutton:
  - Laser Eraser and Pressbutton (with Pedro Henry) (6 issues, Eclipse Comics, Nov. 1985–July 1986)
  - 3-D Laser Eraser and Pressbutton (with Pedro Henry) (Eclipse Comics, August 1986)
  - "Corsairs of Illunium" (with Pedro Henry), in Miracleman #9 (Eclipse Comics, July 1986)
  - "Corsairs of Illunium part 2" (with Pedro Henry), in Miracleman #10 (Eclipse, Comics, Dec. 1986)
  - "Time after Time" (with Pedro Henry), in Miracleman #11 (Eclipse Comics, May 1987)
  - "Time after Time" (with Pedro Henry), in Miracleman #12 (Eclipse Comics, Sept. 1987)
- Tharg's Future Shocks:
  - "Uncommon Sense" by Alan Hebden, with art by Collins and Farmer in ("2000 AD" #372)
  - "It's a Mad, Mad, Mad World!" written by Collins (with art by Alan Davis, in 2000 AD #509, February 1987)
  - "The Jigsaw Man" script and art by Collins in "2000 AD" #539
  - "Tourist Season" written by Collins with art by Simon Harrison in 2000 AD #544, October 1987
  - "The Invisible Man" script by Collins with art by Massimo Belardinelli in ("2000 AD" #554)
  - "Writers' Block" written by Collins with art by Simon Jacob in ("2000 AD" #611)
  - "The God Fish" script by Collins and art by Chris Weston in (2000 AD #636)
  - "Brand Loyalty" written by Collins with art by Paul Marshall in (2000AD #638)
  - "The Getting of Wisdom" written by Collins with art by Dave D'Antiquis in (2000AD #639)
- Judge Dredd:

"Fairlyhyperman" (with John Wagner and Alan Grant in "2000 AD" #529 and #530)

"And the Wind Cried" art by Collins (with Alan Grant, in 2000 AD #637),

"Doomsday" (with John Wagner, in Judge Dredd Megazine #3.58–3.59, 1999)

- Sinister Dexter: "Wising Off" (with Dan Abnett, in 2000 AD #1311, 2002)
- Starfleet Corps of Engineers: "Caveat Emptor" (with Ian Edginton, ebook, 2002, tpb No Surrender, 2003)
- American Gothic (with Ian Edginton, in 2000 AD #1432–1440, 2005)
- Doctor Who Magazine
  - "Profits of Doom" #120-122, written by Collins with pencils by John Ridgway and inks by Mike Perkins.
  - "Claws of the Klathi" written by Collins with pencils by Kevin Hopgood in #136-138
  - "Party Animals" in #173 written by Gary Russell with pencils by Collins and inks by Steve Pini. He also contributed to issues #175-178.
  - "The Nightmare Game" (with Gareth Roberts, in Doctor Who Magazine #330–332, collected in The Flood, 226 pages, 2007, ISBN 978-1-905239-65-8)
  - The Ninth Doctor Collected Comics (98 pages, April 2006) collects:
    - "The Love Invasion" (with Gareth Roberts, in Doctor Who Magazine #355–357)
    - "Art Attack" (art and script, in Doctor Who Magazine #358)
    - "The Cruel Sea" (with Rob Shearman, in Doctor Who Magazine #359–362)
    - "A Groatsworth of Wit" (with Gareth Roberts, in Doctor Who Magazine #363–364)
  - "The Betrothal of Sontar" (with John Tomlinson and Nick Abadzis, in Doctor Who Magazine #365–367)
  - "The Lodger" (with Gareth Roberts, in Doctor Who Magazine #368)
  - "F.A.Q." (with Tony Lee, in Doctor Who Magazine #369–371)
  - "The Futurists" (in Doctor Who Magazine #372–374)
  - "Interstellar Overdrive" (with Jonathan Morris in Doctor Who Magazine #375–376)
  - "The Woman Who Sold the World" (with Rob Davis in Doctor Who Magazine #381–384)
  - "The Stockbridge Child" (with Dan McDaid in Doctor Who Magazine #403–405)
  - "Onompatopoeia" (with Dan McDaid in Doctor Who Magazine #413)
  - "Supernature" (with Jonathan Morris in Doctor Who Magazine #421–423)
  - "The Chains of Olympus" (with Scott Gray in Doctor Who Magazine #442–445)
  - "Imaginary Enemies" (with Scott Gray in Doctor Who Magazine #455)
  - "A Wing and a Prayer" (with Scott Gray in Doctor Who Magazine #462–464)
  - "Pay the Piper" (with Scott Gray in Doctor Who Magazine #468–469)
  - "The Blood of Azreal" (with Scott Gray in Doctor Who Magazine #470–474)
  - "The Instruments of War" (art and script, in Doctor Who Magazine #481–483)
  - "Space Invaders!" (with Mark Wright in Doctor Who Magazine #484)
  - "The Highgate Horror" (with Mark Wright, co-penciller with David A. Roach in Doctor Who Magazine #493)
  - "The Stockbridge Showdown" (with Scott Gray and many other artists in Doctor Who Magazine #500)
  - "The Pestilent Heart" (with Mark Wright in Doctor Who Magazine #501–503)
  - "Be Forgot" (with Mark Wright in Doctor Who Magazine #507)
  - "The Parliament of Fear" (with Mark Wright in Doctor Who Magazine #517)
  - "Herald of Madness" (with Scott Gray in Doctor Who Magazine #535–539)
  - DC Comics
- Peter Cannon, Thunderbolt #1-12 (and interlude in Justice League Quarterly #8.) with scripts and pencils by Collins and inks by Jose Marzan Jr.
- Justice League Quarterly #14 with scripts by Paul Kupperberg and inks by Eduardo Barreto and Mike Vosburg
- Spelljammer #1-6 with scripts by Barbara Kesel and inks by Dan Panosian
- Darkstars #0,18-21,23-38 with scripts by Michael Jan Friedman and inks by Ken Branch
- Martian Manhunter Special 1996 written by Paul Kupperberg
- Dragonlance #5,6,7,8,13,15 and 16 written by Dan Mishkin and inks by Ron Randall and Randy Elliott
- A Christmas Carol (adapted by Sean Michael Wilson, with inks by David Roach, 132 pages, Classical Comics, October 2008, Original Text, ISBN 1-906332-17-7, Quick Text, ISBN 1-906332-18-5)
- The Only Good Dalek, the first graphic novel from BBC Books written by Justin Richards, 128 pages of big screen Dalek action featuring the 11th Doctor and Amy Pond, September 2010, ISBN 1-84607-984-5
