= Steve Roberts (comics) =

British comics artist

- Notable works: Bec & Kawl
- Awards: British Academy Children's Award "Short Form", 2011

Steve Roberts is a British comics artist, best known for his work on the long-running humour strip Bec & Kawl (written by Simon Spurrier).

His iconic style, unusual in a comic known mainly for a combination of realistic techniques and action-packed stories, makes him well-suited for funny strips, and he has collaborated with Dan Abnett on a number of Sinister Dexter comedy one-offs.

== Biography ==
Roberts was originally encouraged in his comics career by Simon Davis, who has continued to act as a mentor. Despite the two artists' styles being very different, they have collaborated on a number of cover images and star scans, with Davis painting over Roberts' inking work.

Roberts has also worked closely with UK animation company SlinkyPics. With Ragdoll he created the animated series Dipdap for CBeebies. He also collaborated with Spurrier on a web-comic for BBC Cult.

== Bibliography ==
=== Comics ===
His comic work includes:

- Sinister Dexter (with Dan Abnett):
  - "Scene of the Crime" (in 2000 AD #1222, 2000)
  - "Dirty Habits" (in 2000 AD #1234, 2001)
  - "Quality Time" (in 2000 AD #1235, 2001)
  - "On the Fidel" (in 2000 AD #1266-1267, 2001)
  - "Tart au Citroen" (in 2000 AD #1282, 2002)
  - "Low Life" (in 2000 AD #1312, 2002)
  - "Bouncers" (in Judge Dredd Megazine #202, 2003)
  - "Gag Reflex" (in Judge Dredd Megazine #203, 2003)
  - "A Night Off" (in Judge Dredd Megazine #242, 2006)
  - "High Tide" (in Judge Dredd Megazine #243, 2006)
  - "Dead Famous" (in Metal Hammer)
  - "A Question of Taste" (in Metal Hammer)
- Bec & Kawl (with Simon Spurrier, tpb, Bec and Kawl: Bloody Students, Rebellion Developments, 2007, 176 pages, ISBN 1-904265-66-9):
  - "and the Mystical Mentalist Menace!" (in 2000 AD #1290-1291, 2002)
  - "Beccy Miller's Diary" (in 2000 AD #1292-1293, 2002)
  - "Enlightenment" (in 2000 AD #1327, 2003)
  - "eeevil.com" (in 2000 AD #1328-1330, 2003)
  - "Pest Control" (in 2000 AD #1351-1354, 2003)
  - "Toothache" (in 2000 AD #1383-1386, 2004)
  - "Hell To Pay" (in 2000 AD #1401-1404, 2004)
  - "Attack of the Cones" (in 2000 AD #1437-1440, 2005)
  - "Freakshow" (in 2000 AD #1477-1481, 2006)
- Whatever Happened To?:
  - "The Gribligs" (with Gordon Rennie, in Judge Dredd Megazine #219, 2004)
  - "Melda Dreepe" (with Alan Grant, in Judge Dredd Megazine #230, 2005)
- One-Off: "Work Experience" (with Simon Spurrier, in 2000 AD #1403-1407, 2004)
- Tharg's Future Shorts: "Game of the Gods" (with Al Ewing, in 2000 AD #1445, 2005)
- Judge Dredd:
  - "Genolympics" (with Simon Spurrier, in Metro, 2004; reprinted: in Judge Dredd Megazine #228, 2005)
  - "Miss Moople" (with Simon Spurrier, in Metro, 2004; reprinted: in Judge Dredd Megazine #231, 2005)
  - "Coast to Coast" (with Simon Spurrier, in Metro, 2004; reprinted: in Judge Dredd Megazine #233, 2005)
  - "Boneheads" (with Simon Spurrier, in Metro, 2004)
  - "Presumption of Guilt" (with Simon Spurrier, in Metro, 2004; reprinted: in Judge Dredd Megazine #238, 2005)
  - "Lucky for Some" (illustrated text story, with Jonathan Clements, in Judge Dredd Megazine #235, 2005)
  - "Electraglide in Silver" (colours, with John Wagner and art by Paul Marshall, in 2000 AD #1475, June 2007)
- Tharg's Future Shocks:
  - "Going, Going, Gone!" (with Gary Wilkinson, in 2000 AD #1475, 2006)
  - "Drive, He Said" (inks, written by Al Ewing, with pencils by Edison George, in '2000 AD' #1532, 2007)
- Banzai Battalion: "Robot Wars" (with John Wagner, in 2000 AD #1501-1506, 2006)
- Kingdom (colours, with Dan Abnett and art by Richard Elson, in 2000 AD #1520-1525, January–February 2007)
- Black Atlantic (with Dan Abnett):
  - "Meet the Jetsams" (in Judge Dredd Megazine #253-255, January–March 2007)
  - "Rig" (in Judge Dredd Megazine #276-278, October–December 2008)
- The Angel Gang: "Before they wuz dead" (with Simon Spurrier in Judge Dredd Megazine #258-262, May–September 2007)

=== Filmography ===
TV and film work includes:

- Dipdap (CBeebies)
- B.O.T. and the Beasties (CBeebies)

== Awards ==
Dipdap won the 2011 British Academy Children's Award in the "Short Form" category.
