= Hard Choices (graphic novella) =

Book by Dan Abnett

- Hard Choices 'What happened on Algol?' Cover art for the 2010, 32 page hardback, available only as part of the Ultramarines: The Movie DVD Collector’s Set.
- Date: November 2010
- Page count: 32 pages
- Publisher: Codex Pictures

Creative team
- Writers: Dan Abnett
- Artists: David Roach

Hard Choices 'What happened on Algol?' is a 32-page graphic novella prequel to Ultramarines: A Warhammer 40,000 Movie written by Dan Abnett, released as part of the Special Edition DVD on 29 November 2010. Hard Choices is a military science fiction story set in the Warhammer 40,000 universe, the protagonists being Space Marines from the Ultramarines Chapter.

== Art ==
Penciling was done by comic book artist David Roach, whose past work has included 2000 AD, Marvel Comics, DC Comics, Dark Horse Comics, and the gaming company Wizards of the Coast.

== Production ==
Hard Choices 'What happened on Algol?' was commissioned to accompany Ultramarines : A Warhammer 40,000 Movie, made by UK-based production company Codex Pictures under licence from Games Workshop, working in association with Good Story Productions Ltd and Montreal based POP6 Studios.

== Release ==
Hard Choices 'What happened on Algol?' accompanies The Special Edition Ultramarines: A Warhammer 40,000 Movie DVD, released worldwide on 29 November 2010.
