= Batman: Two Faces =

1998 comic

- Cover of Batman: Two Faces #1, art by Anthony Williams and Tom Palmer

Publication information
- Publisher: DC Comics
- Format: One-shot
- Genre: Superhero
- Publication date: November 1998
- No. of issues: 1
- Main character(s): Batman; Joker; Selina Kyle; Two-Face

Creative team
- Written by: Dan Abnett; Andy Lanning
- Artist(s): Anthony Williams; Tom Palmer

Batman: Two Faces is a DC Comics Elseworlds comic book, published in 1998. Written by Dan Abnett and Andy Lanning, with art by Anthony Williams and Tom Palmer, the story is based on the novel Strange Case of Dr. Jekyll and Mr. Hyde by Robert Louis Stevenson. A Victorian-era Bruce Wayne tries to purge both his own evil side and that of Two-Face, while a serial killer named the Joker roams the streets. A sequel, The Superman Monster, was published in October the following year.

== Plot ==
In 1888, at the Iceberg Lounge in Gotham City, Commissioner James Gordon tells his friend Peregrine White, proprietor of the newspaper the Daily Planet, a strange tale that happened two years ago.

In 1886, Bruce Wayne organizes a gala to exhibit the Twilight Orchid, a rare flower that is exquisitely colored and perfumed during the day but becomes a weed at night. Among those in attendance are Commissioner Gordon and Pamela Isley. During the gala, Two-Face storms in and steals the flower. Bruce attempts to stop the criminal, but he easily bests him and takes Pamela hostage. As Two-Face and his thugs escape, they kill Pamela while Bruce watches helplessly.

Bruce blames himself for Pamela's death, and Alfred tries to comfort him. Bruce reveals that he hopes to create a potion derived from the flower, retrieved from Pamela's dead hands, to cure Two-Face of his dual personality. Finalizing the potion, Bruce tests it on himself. He suddenly develops superhuman strength, agility, and a new sense of courage and purpose. He puts together a bat-like costume and tries to battle crime on Two-Face's terms.

While Batman destroys Two-Face's criminal empire, Annie, a prostitute who works at Selina Kyle's brothel, accompanies a strange gentleman. The man starts laughing hysterically and kills Annie, who is revealed to be his fourth victim.

Commissioner Gordon asks Bruce Wayne for help; the serial killer who calls himself the Joker is murdering women and mutilating them to look like they are smiling. Bruce dons his cape and cowl and prepares to take down the psychopath. Selina Kyle, donning a crimefighting outfit of her own, attacks him. After revealing his true identity to her, they decide to team up to capture the smiling murderer.

Selina comes upon the Joker attacking a group of Two-Face's lackeys. Selina tries to stop him, but she is no match for his superhuman strength. She tries to run but is injured by the Joker, and by the time Batman arrives to help her, her condition has gotten worse. She is paralyzed from the waist down and will never walk again.

Alfred tries to convince Bruce to stop drinking the potion, which has some detrimental effects. Bruce dismisses his advice and consumes a more powerful batch than before. He falls into a deep sleep and wakes up with a head full of revelations. He writes a letter to Gordon and another to Two-Face, summoning them to a meeting that will be most revealing.

Batman reveals to Gordon that he is putting himself at the law's mercy and to Two-Face that he has a potion that may cure him of his duality. He handcuffs himself and then transforms into the Joker, the opposite side of Batman. Just as one side was courageous and doing its best to stop crime, the other was bent on destruction and chaos.

Two-Face, Gordon, and the Joker fight, and just as the Joker is about to kill Two-Face, Batman takes control of Bruce's body and falls to his death. After flipping his two-headed coin one last time, Two-Face, acting on Bruce's last wishes, takes the potion and creates a new identity for himself, a superhuman who dons the cape and cowl of Batman, fighting for the side of justice.

At the end of the story, White refers to another story that occurred in Bavaria five years before this tale, one that is filled with "inhuman tragedy and blasphemous outrages against nature". This story is revealed in the sequel, The Superman Monster, a retelling of Frankenstein featuring the Superman cast.

== Publication ==
- Batman: Two Faces #1 (paperback, 68 pages, November 1998)

== See also ==
- List of Elseworlds publications
- Gotham by Gaslight
- JLA: The Island of Dr. Moreau
- Wonder Woman: Amazonia
