= The Superman Monster =

1999 Elseworlds story by DC Comics

- Cover of The Superman Monster, art by Anthony Williams and Tom Palmer

Publication information
- Publisher: DC Comics
- Format: One-shot
- Genre: Superhero
- Publication date: October 1999
- No. of issues: 1
- Main character(s): Superman; Vicktor Luthor; Eloise Edge

Creative team
- Written by: Dan Abnett; Andy Lanning
- Artist(s): Anthony Williams; Tom Palmer

The Superman Monster is a DC Comics Elseworlds comic book, published in 1999. The story combines elements of the Superman mythos with Mary Shelley's novel Frankenstein, with its version of Superman being similar to Frankenstein's monster. Written by Dan Abnett and Andy Lanning, with art by Anthony Williams and Tom Palmer, The Superman Monster is the sequel to the DC Comics Elseworlds comic book Batman: Two Faces.

== Plot ==
The story follows on from Batman: Two Faces and unfolds as a tale told to Commissioner Gordon by newspaper magnate Peregrine White in their club, the Iceberg Lounge.

Five years prior, ruthless and amoral student Vicktor Luthor is expelled from the university of Ingolstadt after his experiments in raising the dead offended and outraged his professors. Increasingly obsessed with his research, Luthor schemes to marry Eloise Edge, daughter of the wealthy Burgomeister Edge, only to learn upon their betrothal that Edge has arranged matters so that Luthor will not benefit from Eloise's wealth. Furious, Luthor storms out of his engagement party only to witness a strange object fall from the sky into a nearby forest. Investigating, Luthor discovers that the object is an advanced spacecraft containing the deceased remains of an infant. A projection of the craft's designer, alien scientist Jor-El, reveals that the craft was intended to carry the infant, Jor-El's son, to safety following the destruction of their world.

Luthor realizes that he can use the alien corpse and technology in his experiments, and constructs a "Revival Matrix" which he believes will reanimate the dead, resorting to grave robbery and murder to construct a body to revive. He also adds a strange crest found in the deceased infants' ship as a conductive breast plate. On activating the Revival Matrix, however, Luthor is horrified when the process goes awry, resulting in a creation of an unnaturally pale, malformed and heavily scarred "superman" with abilities beyond those of humans. When the creature identifies Luthor as his father, Luthor rejects him in disgust, and the resulting struggle causes a fire in Luthor's laboratory. The creature rescues Luthor before they were sent back to the ground by a lightning strike.

When he awakens, Luthor returns to Ingolstadt and issues a bounty for the creature to keep his connection to it a secret. The creature is also present in the village, where he is overwhelmed by the noise and activity. Out of instinct, the creature intervenes to rescue the occupant of an out-of-control carriage, who turns out to be Eloise. While she treats him with kindness and gratitude, the other townsfolk attack him out of fear, causing the creature to flee. He eventually makes his way to an isolated farm owned by Johan and Martha Kant, who recently lost their son. After the creature saved Johan from a bear, he and Martha take the creature in, naming him Klaus after their deceased son. Klaus uses his powers to help on their farm, begins to learn the ways of humanity, and his appearance gradually becomes more human.

While grateful to the Kants, Klaus admits that he wishes to resolve matters with his creator, unaware that Luthor has learned of his presence at the farm and has hired a local mob to attack the farm, setting the cottage on fire. Johan attempts to defend his family but suffers a fatal heart attack. Enraged by this, Klaus attacks Luthor, only to be overwhelmed by a green stone recovered from the spacecraft that Luthor had fashioned into a cane. Klaus then returns to the burning cottage to rescue Martha, and Luthor assumes they both died in the blaze. He then returns to Ingolstadt to marry Eloise with his friend James Olafson as his best man, but Klaus appears and crashes the wedding. Luthor produces a gun and tries to shoot Klaus, only for the bullets to bounce off his skin and strike Eloise, killing her. Luthor then uses his cane to subdue Klaus.

After all the guests leave the scene, James stays behind to look after his friend. As he looks for Luthor, he then learns that Burgomeister Edge had been murdered in his sleep via asphyxiation, and then finds Luthor attempting to revive Eloise with his Revival Matrix. Not wanting interference, Luthor shoots James and dumps him downstairs, where he finds a weakened Klaus with a necklace made of the green stones. Luthor resurrects Eloise, but she is overwhelmed by what has happened to her and rejects him. Klaus, arriving too late to intervene, comforts Eloise and offers to help her adjust to her new life. When Luthor tries to stop them, he is battered away, causing a fire which destroys the Revival Matrix. Immune to the flames, Klaus and Eloise embrace and fly away.

At this point, Gordon skeptically interrupts White's story, demanding to know how he knows what happened. White reveals that, while on a ship that had become trapped in ice, he and the crew encountered Luthor, driven mad and searching for a "fortress of solitude" where he believed Klaus and Eloise had eloped. White was able to piece together what had happened from Luthor, who died from hypothermia. Klaus appeared and freed the ship from the ice before taking Luthor's body and returning home. After concluding his tale, White and Gordon part ways from the Lounge.

== Publication ==
- The Superman Monster (paperback, 52 pages, October 1999)
