= Richard Elson =

British comic artist

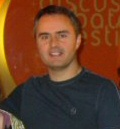
- Born: 1962 (age 63–64)
- Areas: Penciller, Inker, Colourist
- Notable works: Atavar; Sonic the Comic

Richard Elson (born 1962) is a British comic artist best known for his work on Sonic the Comic, 2000 AD and Thor.

== Biography ==
Richard Elson is a fine art graduate with over sixteen years experience as an artist and illustrator.

His versatility has found a wide variety of outlets in a career that has included extended runs on Sonic the Comic and Britain's premier science-fiction anthology 2000 AD. He has contributed to many of the comics published in the UK over recent years, including The Beano (drawing Billy The Cat in 2003, and also Tim Traveller in that year's The Beano Annual), Teenage Mutant Hero Turtles, Toxic Crusaders and Panini Comics' UK title Spectacular Spider-Man Adventures.

His first Marvel Comics work was Marvel Zombies Return: Hulk, with Pride and Prejudice and Zombies Seth Grahame-Smith. He subsequently illustrated issues of Thor and Journey Into Mystery during Kieron Gillen's run writing the titles, and is currently the launch artist on a new series of Morbius, the Living Vampire.

He has also worked for computer games companies, toy manufacturers and UK television show This Morning.

=== Personal life ===
Elson lives in the UK, with his wife and two children, in the cathedral city of Worcester.

== Bibliography ==
Comic work includes:

- Tharg's Future Shocks:
  - "Care" (with Alan McKenzie, in 2000AD #568, 1988)
  - "Accident" (with Larry Watson, in 2000AD #608, 1989)
  - "Spare Parts" (with Simon Spurrier, in 2000AD #1267, 2001)
- Shadows (with Peter Milligan, in 2000 AD #672-681, 1990)
- Tharg's Time Twisters: "Wraggs to Riches" (with Lawrence Miles, in 2000 AD #722, 1991)
- Sonic the Comic: "Sonic" in #7-10, 18, 19, 21–28, 33–38, 45, 47–53, 59–72, 75–78, 80–82, 84–87, 89, 90, 94, 95, 97–100, 102, 104–106, 108–111, 113–119, 121–132, 134–138, 140–141, 143–147, 149–154, 156–158, 160–162, 164, 165, 167, 168, 170–184; "Knuckles" in #39-44, 53–58; "Captain Plunder" in #91-93; "Sonic's World" in #103; covers to #35, 37, 38, 40, 76, 89, 94, 97–102, 109–111, 125, 131, 145, 161, 162, 164, 165, 167, 168, 170-223 (1993–2001)
- Maniac 5: "Maniac 6 Prologue" (with Mark Millar, in 2000 AD Winter Special 1993)
- Sonic the Poster Mag #6 (1994)
- Tyranny Rex: "Deus Ex Machina Book 2" (with John Smith and Paul Marshall, in 2000 AD #873-880, 1994)
- Roadkill: "Roadkill Book 1" (with Dan Abnett, in 2000 AD #1208-1211, 2000)
- Judge Dredd:
  - "The Moby" (with John Wagner, in 2000 AD #1228, 2001)
  - "Nobody" (with Robbie Morrison, in 2000 AD #1467, 2005)
  - "The Incident" (with Robbie Morrison, in 2000 AD #1538, 2007)
  - "Ownership" (with Rob Williams, in 2000 AD #1587-1588, 2008)
  - "Blindside" (with Robbie Morrison, in 2000 AD #1596-1599, 2008)
- Tharg's Future Shocks: "Spare Parts" (with Simon Spurrier, in 2000 AD #1267, 2002)
- Atavar (with Dan Abnett):
  - "Atavar" (in 2000 AD #1281-1288, 2002)
  - "Atavar II" (in 2000 AD #1329-1335, 2003)
  - "Atavar III" (in 2000 AD #1443-1449, 2005)
- The Scrap (with Simon Spurrier, in 2000 AD #1308-1312, 2002)
- Tharg's Terror Tales: "Krypt" (with Nigel Kitching, in 2000AD #1375, 2004)
- A.H.A.B. (with Nigel Kitching, in 2000AD #1387-1395, 2004)
- Go-Machine (with Al Ewing, in 2000 AD #1496-1498, 2006)
- Osprey Graphic History:
  - The Empire Falls: Battle of Midway (with Steve White, 48 pages, October 2006, ISBN 1-84603-058-7)
  - Fight to the Death: Battle of Guadalcanal (with Larry Hama, 48 pages, February 2007, ISBN 1-84603-060-9)
  - The Tide Turns: D-Day Invasion (with Doug Murray and Anthony Williams, 48 pages, September 2007, ISBN 1-84603-056-0)
- Kingdom (with Dan Abnett):
  - "Kingdom" (in 2000 AD, Prog 2007 and #1518-1525, 2006–2007)
  - "The Promised Land" (in 2000 AD, Prog 2008 and #1567-76, 2007–2008)
  - "Call of the Wild" (in 2000 AD #1650-1661, 2009)
  - "His Master's Voice" (in 2000 AD, Prog 2011 and #1715-1725, 2011)
- Marauder (with Robbie Morrison, in 2000 AD Prog 2009, #1617-1627, 2008–2009)
- Marvel Zombies Return: Hulk (with writer Seth Grahame-Smith, one-shot, Marvel Comics, November 2009)
- Wolverine: Savage (with Ryan Dunlavey, one-shot, Marvel Comics, April 2010)
- Thor #607-present: "Siege: Ragnarok" (with Kieron Gillen, Marvel Comics, April 2010–present)
- New Avengers (AAFES) 8: The Promise (with Paul Tobin, one-shot, Marvel Comics, May 2010)
- Skaar, Son of Hulk (with Fred Van Lente, in Origins of Marvel Comics, one-shot, Marvel Comics, July 2010)
- The Amazing Spider-Man #698: "Dying Wish" prelude
