= Greg Staples =

British artist

- Areas: Penciler; Inker; Painter
- Notable works: Judge Dredd

Greg Staples is an English comic book artist.

== Biography ==
Greg Staples' first job on leaving school was as a trainee draftsman in an architects office in Sheffield.

He also spent time working in a comic and film memorabilia shop and also a computer game store, both also in Sheffield, South Yorkshire.

Greg spent some time working for the Computer Games Company Gremlin Graphics.

Staples has also worked on video production for music videos for artists such as Muse (Sing For Absolution) and Shaznay Lewis (You).

Staples is known for his work in the weekly British comic 2000 AD, especially on Judge Dredd.

He has also produced work for the games company Wizards of the Coast and drawn numerous comic book characters including Batman and Spider-Man.

Staples has illustrated cards for the collectible card game Magic: The Gathering, and digital collectible card game Hearthstone.

Staples did the cover art for Dungeons & Dragons books Races of Faerûn (2003), and Fantastic Locations: Dragondown Grotto (2006).

== Bibliography ==
Comics work includes:

- Judge Dredd:
  - "Rough Guide to Suicide" (with Garth Ennis, in 2000 AD #761, 1991)
  - "Babes in Arms" (with Garth Ennis, in 2000 AD #776-779, 1992)
  - "Innocents Abroad" (with Garth Ennis, in 2000 AD #804-807, 1992)
  - "Blind Mate" (with Garth Ennis, in 2000 AD #825, 1993)
  - "Enter: Jonni Kiss" (with Garth Ennis, in 2000 AD #830, 1993)
  - "Mad City" (with John Wagner, in 2000 AD #1050-1052, 1997)
- Brigand Doom: "Death's Door" (with John Tomlinson, in 2000AD Sci-Fi Special 1992)
- Tharg's Terror Tales: "The Tooth Fairy" (with Mark Millar, in 2000 AD #839, 1993)
- Sláine (with Pat Mills):
  - "Jealousy of Niamh" (in 2000 AD #850-851, 1993)
  - "Name of the Sword" (in 2000 AD #950-956, 1995)
  - "Beyond" (in 2000 AD prog 2000, 1999)
- The Clown (with Igor Goldkind):
  - "Vale of Tears" (in 2000AD Yearbook 1994, 1993)
  - "The Clown Book 2" (with Robert Bliss, in 2000 AD #881-888, 1994)
- Loaded (with Garth Ennis and Les Spink, video game tie-in, 1996)
- Sinister Dexter (with Dan Abnett):
  - "London Town" (in 2000 AD #1084, 1998)
  - "Drop Dead Gorgeous" (in 2000 AD #1090-1091, 1998)
  - "Anatomy of a Throwdown" (in 2000 AD #1112, 1998)
- Downlode Tales: "The Whack Pack" (with Dan Abnett, in 2000 AD #1152-1154, 1999)
- Tales of Telguuth: "A Little Knowledge" (with Steve Moore, in 2000 AD #1191, 2000)
- JLA: Riddle of the Beast (with Alan Grant, Elseworlds DC Comics, hardcover, 2001, paperback, 2003)
- Swallow #3 (IDW Publishing, 2007)

=== Covers ===
- The Dying Earth Roleplaying Game, Pelgrane Press (2001). ISBN 978-0953998005
