= Anthony Williams (comics) =

Welsh comic book artist

- Areas: Writer, Penciller

Anthony Williams is a Welsh comic book artist.

== Biography ==
He broke into comics at Marvel UK, drawing for the series Action Force, The Real Ghostbusters and Transformers, among others. Subsequent British work has included the venerable science fiction comic 2000 AD, for which he has drawn features including Kola Commandos, Mean Arena, PJ Maybe and Robo-Hunter.

His best-known work includes DC Comics' Doctor Fate series Fate; writer Mark Millar's The Unfunnies for Avatar Press; and for Marvel Comics, the first X-Men movie adaptation, and the nine-issue run of Hokum & Hex, a superhero title created by author Clive Barker for Marvel's Razorline imprint.

Williams has additionally drawn issues of comics starring Batman, Spider-Man, Superman and Scooby-Doo, with notable work that includes Marvel's Squadron Supreme: New World Order bookshelf-format one-shot (Sept. 1998); DC's Elseworlds prestige-format one-shot "The Superman Monster" (Dec. 1999) and "Batman: Two Faces" (1998), and several issues of Games Workshop's Warhammer Monthly.

Williams additionally works as a commercial artist on national and international advertising and marketing campaigns; has illustrated children's books; and has drawn concept art and storyboards for both live-action and animated films as well as television programs like Doctor Who.

== Bibliography ==
Hokum & Hex No. 1 (Sept. 1993). Cover art by Williams and Andy Lanning

- The Real Ghostbusters (with Dan Abnett, Marvel UK 1988–1992):
  - A Hard Day's Fright (collects The Real Ghostbusters #1–7, 9, 11, 19, 50 and 99, 96 pages, October 2005, Titan Books, ISBN 1-84576-140-5)
  - Who You Gonna Call? (collects The Real Ghostbusters No. 12, 16, 19, 24, 33, 48, 52 and 53, 1989 Annual, 1990 Annual, 1992 Annual, 96 pages, April 2006, Titan Books, ISBN 1-84576-141-3)
  - Which Witch Is Which? (96 pages, July 2006, Titan Books, ISBN 1-84576-142-1)
  - This Ghost Is Toast! (96 pages, November 2006, Titan Books, ISBN 1-84576-143-X)
- Judge Dredd:
  - "Wot I Did During Necropolis" (with John Wagner, in 2000 AD #707–709, 1990)
  - "The Magic Mellow Out" (with Garth Ennis, in 2000 AD #808–809, 1992)
  - "The Kinda Dead Man" (with Garth Ennis, in 2000 AD No. 816, 1993)
  - "PJ & the Mock-Choc Factory" (with Garth Ennis, in 2000 AD #820–822, 1993)
  - "A Man Called Greener" (with Garth Ennis, in 2000 AD No. 828, 1993)
  - "Trial by Gunfire" (with D.G. Chichester, Inks: Andy Lanning, in Legends of the Law #5-7, 1995)
  - "Blaster Buddy" (with John Wagner, in 2000 AD No. 954, 1995)
  - "C-H-A-M-P!" (with Dan Abnett, in 2000 AD No. 967, 1995)
  - "Dead Ringer" (with John Wagner, in Judge Dredd Megazine #3.67, 2000)
  - "Cold Comfort" (with John Wagner, in 2000 AD #1225, 2001)
  - "Star Drekk: A Space Fantasy" (with John Wagner, in 2000 AD #1232, 2001)
  - "One of our simps is missing" (with Gordon Rennie, in Judge Dredd Megazine #4.14, 2002)
  - "Visiting Hour" (with Gordon Rennie, in 2000 AD #1423, 2005)
  - "Fitness Test" (with Gordon Rennie, in 2000 AD #1484, 2006)
- Judge Anderson: "Exorcise Duty" (with Andy Lanning and Dan Abnett, in Judge Dredd Annual 1991)
- Robo-Hunter (with Mark Millar):
  - "Escape from Bisleyland" (in 2000 AD #750–759, 1991)
  - "Aces of Slades" (in 2000 AD #813–816, 1992–1993)
- Kola Kommandos (with Steve Parkhouse, in 2000 AD #790–794, 1992)
- Mean Arena: "Mean Arena" (with Alan McKenzie, in 2000 AD #852–863, 1993)
- Hokum & Hex (with Frank Lovece, Marvel, 1993–1994)
- Big Dave: "Costa del Chaos" (with Grant Morrison and Mark Millar, in 2000 AD #869–872, 1994)
- Babe Race 2000 (with Mark Millar)
  - "Babe Race 2000" (in 2000 AD #883–888, 1994)
  - "Bounty Hunter Mom" (in 2000AD Yearbook 1995)
- Fate #0–22 (with John Francis Moore and Len Kaminski, DC, 1994–1996)
- Sinister Dexter (with Dan Abnett):
  - "Curl Up And Die" (in 2000 AD No. 982, 1996)
  - "Max Vactor" (in 2000 AD No. 984, 1996)
  - "Slay Bells in the Snow" (in 2000 AD prog 2002, 2001)
  - "Places to go, people to do" (in 2000 AD #1508—1513, 2006)
  - "Pros and Cons" (in 2000 AD #1517, 2006)
  - "Normal Service" (in 2000 AD #1539, 2007)
  - "Life is an Open Casket " (in 2000 AD #1560–1565, 2007)
  - "Yer Ass From Yer Elbow" (in 2000 AD #1589-ongoing, 2008)
- Mean Machine: "Close Encounters of the Mean Kind" (with Gordon Rennie, in 2000AD Sci-Fi Special 1996)
- Batman: "Two Faces" (with co-writers Dan Abnett and Andy Lanning, inks by Tom Palmer, one shot Elseworlds story, DC, 1998)
- Superman: "The Superman Monster" (with co-writers Dan Abnett and Andy Lanning, inks by Tom Palmer, one shot Elseworlds story, DC, 1999)
- Tharg's Future Shocks: "Decontamination Procedure" (with Steve Moore, in 2000 AD #1269, 2001)
- The V.C.s (with Dan Abnett):
  - "Look on the Bright Side" (in 2000 AD #1327, 2002)
  - "Escher's Well" (in 2000 AD prog 2003, 2002)
  - "Shotgun" (in 2000 AD #1328, 2003)
  - "Tickover" (in 2000 AD #1329, 2003)
  - "Bystander" (in 2000 AD #1330–1331, 2003)
  - "Green" (in 2000 AD #1332, 2003)
  - "E & E" (in 2000 AD #1333, 2003)
  - "M.I.A." (in 2000 AD #1334, 2003)
  - "Charon" (in 2000 AD #1335, 2003)
  - "Down" (in 2000 AD prog 2004 #1371–1379, 2003–2004)
  - "Old Soldiers" (in 2000 AD # 1432–1441, 2005)
  - "Mail Call" (in 2000 AD # 1486–1495, 2006)
- Island of Terror – Battle of Iwo Jima (with Larry Hama, Osprey Graphic History, October 2006)
- Fight to the Death – Battle of Guadalcanal (with Larry Hama, Osprey Graphic History, 48 pages, February 2007, ISBN 1-84603-060-9)
