= Dipdap =

- Created by: Steve Roberts
- Theme music composer: Ben Bartlett
- Country of origin: United Kingdom
- Original language: English (no dialogue)
- No. of seasons: 1
- No. of episodes: 52

Production
- Executive producer: Anne Wood
- Producer: Chris Wood
- Editor: Lee Phillips
- Running time: 3 minutes
- Production company: Ragdoll Worldwide

Original release
- Network: CBeebies
- Release: 3 January – 26 July 2011

Dipdap is a British children's television series on CBeebies, in which a drawn line creates endless challenges and surprises for the unsuspecting little character Dipdap.

In 2012, it was reported that the show would not return for a second series.

== Background ==
The series was created by Steve Roberts and produced by Ragdoll Worldwide, the joint venture of Ragdoll Productions and BBC Worldwide.

== Broadcast ==
The series airs on CBeebies in the United Kingdom. In Canada, The series was broadcast on TFO.

- TFO
- CBeebies

== Awards ==
Dipdap won the 2011 British Academy Children's Award in the "Short Form" category.

== Episodes ==
No.	Title	Original release date
101A	"Egg"	3 January 2011
The line draws an egg. Dipdap wants to stop it from breaking but the line doesn't make it easy. the egg hatches into a friendly dinosaur at the end.
101B	"Robot"	4 January 2011
The line draws a robot, which scares Dipdap. He keeps running away but the robot keeps finding him.
102A	"Stars"	5 January 2011
The line draws a sky full of stars. Dipdap accidentally knocks one down, then tries to find a way to put it back.
102B	"Flowers"	6 January 2011
The line draws a seed. Each time Dipdap plants it, flowers grow, causing much mischief.
103A	"Letter"	7 January 2011
The line draws Dipdap a letter. He goes to post it but strong winds get in the way.
103B	"Weather"	10 January 2011
Dipdap makes the most of the weather, but the line spoils his fun.
104A	"Balloons"	11 January 2011
Dipdap thinks the balloons will keep him out of the mud, but the line has other ideas.
104B	"Comic"	12 January 2011
The line draws Dipdap a comic about aliens. Dipdap is so engrossed that he fails to notice the aliens all around him.
105A	"Hats"	13 January 2011
The line draws on hats that Dipdap loves to wear, but they have surprises in store for him.
105B	"Sun"	14 January 2011
The line draws the sun. Dipdap settles down to relax, but all sorts of sea creatures make this rather difficult.
106A	"Sleep"	17 January 2011
Dipdap is very sleepy and wants to doze off in bed, but the Line has other ideas.
106B	"Radio"	18 January 2011
The Line draws Dipdap a radio. It plays great music and Dipdap wants to dance, but noisy seals keep causing a disruption.
107A	"Butterfly"	19 January 2011
The Line draws a butterfly. Dipdap is entranced and tries to fly too.
107B	"Ball"	6 February 2011
Dipdap plays with a ball drawn by the Line, but his games are disrupted.
108A	"Scary Thing"	21 January 2011
The Line draws a scary thing to frighten Dipdap.
108B	"Bus"	24 January 2011
The Line draws a bus. Dipdap has quite an adventure trying to catch it.
109A	"Clockwork"	25 January 2011
The Line draws Dipdap a key. He uses it to wind up clockwork objects.
109B	"Baby"	26 January 2011
Dipdap tries to soothe a baby, but the Line keeps drawing noisy objects.
110A	"Home"	27 January 2011
The Line draws different homes. Dipdap is surprised to find he is not always welcome.
110B	"Feet"	17 February 2011
Dipdap performs some fancy footwork with the huge feet drawn by the Line.
111A	"Plant"	31 January 2011
The line draws a plant for Dipdap to take care of.
111B	"Sea Monster"	1 February 2011
The line draws mountains for Dipdap to climb, but they are not quite what they seem.
112A	"Chicken"	2 February 2011
The Line draws a chick. Dipdap tries to look after it, but it won't stop running about.
112B	"Dive"	3 February 2011
When the Line draws a swimming pool, Dipdap tries to dive in.
113A	"Obstacle"	4 February 2011
The Line draws Dipdap a bike which he loves to ride.
113B	"Mess"	7 February 2011
The Line draws Dipdap a vase, which he smashes. Dipdap does his best to clean up the mess.
114A	"Chair"	8 February 2011
Dipdap has a tricky time trying to get comfy in chairs drawn by the Line.
114B	"Dragon"	9 February 2011
The Line draws a dragon. Dipdap tries to lose the dragon in a castle.
115A	"Boat"	10 February 2011
The Line draws boats for Dipdap to play in, but all is not as it seems.
115B	"Sad Thing"	11 February 2011
The Line draws a very sad thing. Dipdap does his best to cheer it up.
116A	"Tent"	6 June 2011
Dipdap keeps being disturbed by a noisy creature and can't settle down in his tent.
116B	"Sticky"	7 June 2011
Dipdap is caught in a sticky mess when the Line draws some bubblegum.
117A	"Dig"	8 June 2011
The Line draws Dipdap a spade so he can dig down to investigate a strange sound.
117B	"Wrong Noises"	9 June 2011
The Line draws animals, but they are all making the wrong noises.
118A	"Snow Storm"	10 June 2011
The Line draws a little man and his house. Dipdap tries his hardest not to annoy him.
118B	"Bubble"	13 June 2011
The Line draws many colourful bubbles and Dipdap loves to burst them.
119A	"Ladder"	14 June 2011
Dipdap tries to use ladders to reach an apple, but they are not what they seem.
119B	"Headphones"	15 June 2011
The Line draws headphones and Dipdap hears music and cannot stop dancing.
120A	"Leak"	16 June 2011
Dipdap tries to plug leaks drawn by the Line, but the Line makes it difficult for him.
120B	"Sculpture"	17 June 2011
Dipdap tries to create sculptures from shapes drawn by the Line.
121A	"Switch"	11 July 2011
The Line draws a switch. Dipdap tries to pull the switch but the Line gets in the way.
121B	"Socks"	12 July 2011
The Line draws some smelly socks. Dipdap tries to get away from the smell.
122A	"Disappearing Books"	13 July 2011
The Line draws books for Dipdap, but when Dipdap tries to read them they disappear.
122B	"Beanstalk"	14 July 2011
Dipdap tries to climb a beanstalk but the Line doesn't make it easy for him.
123A	"Sports"	15 July 2011
The Line draws some sporty challenges and Dipdap tries to compete.
123B	"Tomato"	18 July 2011
The Line draws a giant tomato that rolls after Dipdap.
124A	"Umbrella"	19 July 2011
The Line draws an umbrella which protects Dipdap from unpredictable weather.
124B	"Guests"	20 July 2011
The Line draws Dipdap three cakes, but every time he tries to eat one he is interrupted.
125A	"Lost Alien"	21 July 2011
The Line draws an alien that drops to Earth. Dipdap helps to get the alien back home.
125B	"Gallery"	22 July 2011
The Line draws pictures for Dipdap but they are not what they seem.
126A	"Sneeze"	25 July 2011
The Line draws a pig and Dipdap accidentally makes it sneeze.
126B	"Cute Thing"	26 July 2011
The Line draws a cute thing (which is actually a Russian doll) and Dipdap tries to protect it from heavy objects.
