= American Gothic (comics) =

Story from 2000 AD magazine

"American Gothic" is also the name of a storyline in comics related to the Swamp Thing.

2000AD #1432 (March 2005)

American Gothic is a horror/western story from 2000 AD, created by Ian Edginton and Mike Collins.

== Plot ==
A group of freaks and monsters are trying to escape to a better life in the American West but are being hunted. A lone vampire cowboy eventually agrees to help them.

== Publication ==
- American Gothic (by Ian Edginton and Mike Collins, in 2000 AD #1432–1440, 2005).

== See also ==
- Fiends of the Eastern Front, another major 2000 AD story containing vampires.
