= David Roach (comics) =

British comic book artist and writer

- Areas: Writer, Artist

David Roach is a British comic book artist and writer based in Wales, United Kingdom. Roach actively illustrates for many companies, including 2000 AD, Panini Comics, Marvel Comics, DC Comics, Dark Horse Comics, Topps, and the gaming company Wizards of the Coast.

== Career ==
Roach started comic book illustration in the 1980s, self-publishing the Hellfire fanzine. Since 1988 Roach has worked as an inker and penciller for 2000 AD on such titles as Nemesis the Warlock, Judge Anderson, Judge Dredd and Synnamon.

In the 1990s, Roach started producing work for DC Comics, drawing Batman and Demon and inking Challengers of the Unknown. Roach contributed to the Dark Horse Comics' Star Wars: Tales of the Jedi.

Roach is associate editor of the U.S. based magazine Comic Book Artist, which is dedicated to the historical representation of comic-book characters. Roach was co-editor of The Warren Companion: The Definitive Compendium to the Great Comics of Warren Publishing (2001) the revised edition of the Slings and Arrows Comics Guide (2003) and The Superhero Book: The Ultimate Encyclopedia of Comic Book Icons and Hollywood Heroes (2004).

Roach has worked as illustrator for consecutive Dungeons & Dragons role playing game book titles for publisher Wizards of the Coast.

Roach's later work has included working as a storyboard artist and penciller of accompanying graphic novel, Hard Choices 'What happened on Algol?', for Ultramarines: The Movie both written by Dan Abnett and released on 29 November 2010.
