= The V.C.s =

- Cover to the first trade paperback, by Garry Leach
- Created by: Gerry Finley-Day

Publication information
- Publisher: Fleetway; Rebellion Developments
- Schedule: Weekly
Title(s)
2000 AD #140–175
2000 AD #1300–1306
2000 AD #1327
2000 AD Prog 2003
2000 AD #1328
2000 AD #1329
2000 AD #1330–1331
2000 AD #1332
2000 AD #1333
2000 AD #1334
2000 AD #1335
2000 AD Prog 2004 and #1371–1379
2000 AD #1432–1441
2000 AD #1486–1495
- Formats: Original material for the series has been published as a strip in the comics anthology(s) 2000 AD.
- Original language: English
- Genre: Military science fiction
- Publication date: November 1979 – July 2006
- Main character(s): Jupe; Steve Smith; Hen-Sho; Ringer; Dwarf Star; Loon

Creative team
- Writer(s): Gerry Finley-Day; Steve MacManus; Dan Abnett
- Artist(s): Mike McMahon; Garry Leach; Cam Kennedy; John Richardson; Henry Flint; Anthony Williams

Reprints
- Collected editions
- You're Hit, You're Dead!: ISBN 1-905437-83-8
- Back into Action: ISBN 1905437978

The V.C.s was a future war series that first appeared in the British science fiction comic 2000 AD No. 140 – 178 (1979–1980). Written by Gerry Finley-Day, the first episode was drawn by Mike McMahon who designed the craft and the main characters. The main series artists were Cam Kennedy, Garry Leach and John Richardson. Dan Abnett later the series at Book 5 with the help of artist Anthony Williams.

== Characters ==
=== First Geek War ===
The original V.C.s were:

- Jupe, the crew's sergeant and ship's captain. Genetically engineered for life on the moons of Jupiter, giving him a huge physical presence and above normal strength. During the fight on the Geeks' fake homeworld, he is blinded by the light from the binary stars above, and is taken off active duty. A hardened fighter, being blinded did little to dull his fighting edge and he was still capable of snapping a Geek's neck with his bare hands.
- Hen-Sho, the ship's 'missile man'; a native of Mars, which has been colonised by the Chinese. Hen-Sho has a highly evolved code of honour. A skilled martial artist, excelling in the use of the las-lance. While on a mission to locate the Geek homeworld in a stolen Geek ship, he was mortally wounded by shrapnel from a shipboard explosion. He evacuated Smith and Loon to the two remaining lifepods and died when the ship was destroyed.
- Ringer, the ship's pilot, born on an outpost orbiting Saturn. He takes an instant dislike to Smith and becomes his main adversary, attacking him multiple times and even attempting to kill him once. He was driven insane after a Geek torture session and remains unfit for duty until Smith rescues him on the flagship. An expert with the 'kill-disc', a Saturnian powered weapon capable of decapitating its target. He demonstrated this weapon's effectiveness on the Dishwasher, slicing his head off at short range. He took a las-beam meant for Smith and died seconds later.
- Dwarf Star, a mutant and the ship's port gunner. His family was attacked by the Geeks while on a colony ship bound for Neptune. The ship was attacked by the Geeks and was forced to make a jump to hyperspace to escape; but the hyperspace jump affected the colonists. Though the ship reached Neptune, Dwarf Star and his identical twin brother Midge were born deformed, with "no hair, strange eyes and mis-shapen faces". In the course of the story Smith is forced to fire on Midge's ship which had been captured by Geeks, killing Midge and souring relations between himself and Dwarf Star. Dwarf Star was flushed into space when a barrage from a Geek ambush force cracked open his gun turret, sacrificing himself to seal the door and save the rest of the ship.
- Loon, the ship's starboard gunner. Prior to joining the V.C.s, he spent six years performing garrison detail on the Moon for disorderly conduct, which left him mentally unstable. He had a tendency to giggle inanely; Loon was also prone to carrying a teddy bear (much to the annoyance of Dwarf Star) and occasionally covering himself in war paint and going on a murderous rampage. He is killed by a Geek fighter-craft on a moon above the Geek homeworld.
- Crick. Killed in action before the first series started.

They were joined by:

- Steve Smith. The main protagonist of the series. An 'earthworm' (derogatory term used by colonists for all those born on Earth) who signed on as a new recruit. Assigned to replace the late Crick, much to the chagrin of his new crewmates. Being an 'earthworm', he is near-universally disliked by his new crewmates- especially Ringer, who has a hatred for worms and tries to provoke him at every turn. He finally starts to toughen up and gain respect when Earth is bombed by the Geeks, killing his family. During the assault on Geek space he retrained as a star-scout. He played a pivotal role in the first Geek War by destroying Geek High Command. General Moore promoted him to Second Lieutenant for his actions, and he rose to the rank of major between the first and second series. The effects of the first war gave him post-traumatic stress disorder and he was prone to hallucinations, haunted by visions of his dead comrades. By the beginning of the second series, his military career has finished and he works as a janitor, but when the second war starts he is quick to sign up again.
- Brother, the ship's computer. He controlled the ship's other systems, and interacted with the crew via a 'mouthpiece': an anthropomorphic avatar that originally resembled a court jester, but an ion storm damaged his personality tapes, turning him into a hippie. Following a three-hour flirtation with pacifism, Smith and Loon were able to persuade him to resume normal service. His avatar was redesigned to suit his new personality, but his behaviour remained erratic and his dialogue peppered with underground jargon. His avatar was also capable of using weapons, as shown when he helps the crew fend off a horde of young Geeks armed with two pistols. He is presumably 'killed' when the original V.C. ship is destroyed above the Geek homeworld.

Other major characters

- The Dishwasher. Members of the Diplomatic Corps were all called 'dishwashers' and were universally despised by the star-troopers for their cowardly demeanor and futile attempts to reason with the Geeks. One unnamed member of this group took command of the Terran reprisal fleet sent to end the first Geek war. Sadistic, cowardly and arrogant, he quickly came to hate the V.C.s, and sought to kill them by sending them on a series of suicide missions that blinded Jupe; sent Ringer mad and claimed the lives of Dwarf Star, Hen-Sho and Loon. He aided the Geeks when they infiltrated his flagship, tried to kill Smith to cover his tracks, but was decapitated by Ringer's kill-disc.
- General Moore, second-in-command of Task Force Titan. A cyborg and experienced field officer of the Global Combat Corps, respected by all the star troopers for his record and perseverance. Forced to play second fiddle to the 'Dishwasher', he nonetheless helps Smith and Jupe rescue the rookie soldiers on the Geeks' fake homeworld. Later assumed command of the task force and proved instrumental, along with Smith, in wiping out Geek High Command.

=== Second Geek War ===
When the team was reformed new members included:

- Kali, the pilot from the Kuiper belt.
- Ryx, the gunnery sergeant who takes the main turret. He was born on one of the Neptune colonies.
- Keege, the port gunner and one of the Geek sympathisers working with humans against the more militaristic members of their society.
- Tommy Hoff, the new starboard gunnery recruit occupying a similar role to Smith when he first joined the V.C.s.
- Tycho, the new 'missile man' despite being a woman. Another new recruit from the lunar colonies but tougher (and madder) than Hoff.

== Plot ==
The strip is set in the year 2531. The Solar System is engaged in a war of survival against an alien species known as "Geeks". Steve Smith, a raw recruit, has just completed his training and signed on with the Global Combat Corps as a star-trooper, but is quickly thrown in at the deep end: he is assigned to the hard-bitten crew of a space patrol ship crewed by the "Vacuum Cleaners" or V.C.s for short; so called because of their penchant for clean kills, with little to no debris. The twist is that Smith is the only Earth-born crew member: the rest of the crew are all from colonies on the other planets of the Solar System, often being physically adapted to alien environments, and having little love for 'Ma Earth'. A major theme of this series is the antagonism between the crew (often racially motivated), particularly towards the "earthworm" Smith; and Smith's struggle for acceptance by the crew. Like many war stories, there is a high mortality rate amongst the main characters.

The V.C.s are regarded with contempt by the Earth-led high command, but are acknowledged as the best crew in the fleet. Eventually, the Diplomatic Corps (known as 'dishwashers') recalls most of the fleet back to the colonies in an effort to show the Geeks that they mean peace. However, the Geeks take this as an opportunity, and a Geek armada attacks every major colony in the system, including Mars and Earth. After this, a counterattack is launched against the Geek homeworld by the Dishwashers. Following a preliminary attack on what was thought to be the Geeks' home planet, the V.C.s disobey orders by going down to the planet to save a platoon of 'green' soldiers. The 'Dishwasher' in charge perceives this as a slight, and gives the V.C.s punishment by sending them on near-suicidal duties. Much in the style of The Dirty Dozen this results in a high fatality rate and over the course of the series all of the V.C.s save Smith and Jupe are killed off. Ultimately Smith, the sole member of the original V.C.s who remains fighting fit, leads a heroic attack on the Geek homeworld that ends the war.

The VCs were revived in 2000 AD in 2002 and are still active. The new series is written by Dan Abnett and initially drawn by Henry Flint, later replaced by Anthony Williams. In the new stories Smith, now a major, is a veteran of the first Human-Geek war who leads a squad of raw recruits when a new war breaks out between the two races just as Earth is on the verge of joining the Polity, a galactic alliance of species. It was later revealed that "The Polity" was behind both wars. At the end of Book V, the Humans finally negotiated a deal with the Geeks.

== Alien races ==
=== Human ===
Even though they are still considered a single species, the humans of the 26th century appear to be a race at the threshold of evolutionary divergence. They have spread to the rest of the Solar System, colonising the many planets, moons and planetoids within the influence of their sun. A belligerent, persistent and aggressive species, they have risen to each challenge presented by their dozens of new homes, building stations, fortresses and cities wherever the space can be found, and even undergoing genetic treatment to better adapt to their worlds. A great deal of animosity that shares elements of both racism and national pride exists between the colonists and the humans that chose to remain on Earth. Smith, upon encountering the V.C.s, observed in his diary that his comrades were all 'half-castes', while his father, upon seeing Jupe on a vid-screen was surprised to see a 'real, live Jovian' and described him as an 'ugly-lookin' fish'. Conversely, the V.C.s, all colonists from different worlds, often used the term 'earthworm' to describe Smith and his compatriots.

By the time of the second war, humanity had even colonised the Kuiper belt, tightening their grasp over their Solar System.

=== Geek ===
Also known as "G'egeekajee", they physiologically tend to be upright and humanoid in outline, but all resemblance to humans stops there. They are a polymorphic species of r-strategists (prolific reproducers). Geeks possess a strange blend of reptilian and insectoid characteristics, perfectly adapted to life on their jungle homeworld.

During the first war, they often used guerrilla tactics and traps against the humans, rather than straightforward warfare. Whilst they can and do engage in battle, they are far more fond of weakening the enemy first and then going in for the kill afterwards. Examples of their tactics include:

- Constructing hives inside asteroids; when activated with a special signal, thousands of Geek young are released to attack. This trap nearly overwhelmed the V.C.s until Smith figured out their control vector and got Brother to send a countersignal, disorienting them.
- Capturing a ship and its crew and forcing the crew to lure others into a killzone; this was tried with Midge's ship, but he managed to get a coded message through to the V.C.s in time for them to react.
- Using a lake on an otherwise desert planet as cover in order to ambush troops landing on the planet.

Geeks have an emphasis on controlled breeding, which pervades their culture and tactics. Many Geeks are predestined for one role or another; the circumstances of their creation generating specific physical characteristics. They are several different kinds or castes of Geek: the most common serve as soldiers, appearing identical to human eyes but for a distinguishing pheromone. A Geek general is recognisable by its swollen cranium and facial tentacles, suggesting that it and others like it are bred for heightened intelligence and advanced tactical planning. Some Geeks are bred solely for the purpose of breeding; they are sent into ships as kamikaze troops, laying dozens of eggs at the moment of death in order to overwhelm the enemy with their young.

The Geeks first became involved in human history when they waged war on humanity during the early 26th century. The resultant interstellar war affected every one of the burgeoning colony worlds in the Solar System held by the humans. Notable victories scored by the Geeks during this first space war included:

- An attack resulting in the destruction of Phobos Harbour and the Martian colony cities, including New Peking City, built on the peak of Olympus Mons; an attack that wiped out a good portion of the human military.
- Attacking the Jovian colony on Ganymede.
- Destroying Transatlantic City (Smith's home city) on Earth.

The Geeks use the inner phonemes as abbreviations so the name they call themselves, G'Egeekajee, becomes Geek and their name for humans, Kajeek'Gedek'Ka'Aak, becomes Eeek-Ek-Aak (this means "murderous pink-skins of Earth"). They are capable of speaking English, but this is only shown by leaders of the Geek military.

=== Other races ===
==== The Polity ====
A member of the Polity

The Polity are an intergalactic superpower that have advanced technology such as the ability to freeze time. They start wars between other aliens for their own amusement. It is late revealed in "Mail Call" that they consider themselves to have evolved so much that they now believe that they are unable or unsuited to fight, they have to rely on mercenaries such as the Naxon to fight their wars. It is also revealed that any species within their empire are slave races. In the end, their spies informed them that the Humans were secretly negotiating with the Geek Apologist faction for a peace treaty. The Polity decided to sabotage the peace talks and enlisted the help of Naxon mercenaries to assassinate the Apologist leader.

==== Naxon ====
A Naxon

A "race of exterminators" according to Keege, they act as mercenaries to the highest bidder exterminating entire species. They have highly advanced military technology that can destroy an Earth ship with their shield at 100%. Contacted by "The Polity" during an extermination of the natives of 41 Hydra to assassinate a Geek ambassador to Earth, they were unsuccessful in their mission after the entire group perished and their leader killed.

== Publications ==
They have largely appeared in their own eponymous strip in 2000 AD:

- The V.C.s:
  - "The VCs" (with Gerry Finley-Day and Steve MacManus as Ian Rogan (6); Art: Mike McMahon (1), Garry Leach (2, 5, 8–9, 14–15, 21–22 and 25–26), Cam Kennedy (3–4, 6,-7, 10–13, 16–20, 23–24 and 27) and John Richardson (28–32), in 2000 AD #140–175, 1979–1980, collected in You're Hit, You're Dead!, 144 pages, December 2008, ISBN 1-905437-83-8)
  - Back in Action (by Dan Abnett, 160 pages, April 2009, ISBN 1-905437-97-8) collects:
    - "Peace Day" (with Henry Flint, in 2000 AD #1300–1306, 2002)
    - "Escher's Well" (with Anthony Williams, in 2000 AD Prog 2003, 2002)
    - "Look on the Bright Side" (with Anthony Williams, in 2000 AD #1327, 2002)
    - "Shotgun" (with Anthony Williams, in 2000 AD #1328, 2003)
    - "Tickover" (with Anthony Williams, in 2000 AD #1329, 2003)
    - "Bystander" (with Anthony Williams, in 2000 AD #1330–1331, 2003)
    - "Green" (with Anthony Williams, in 2000 AD #1332, 2003)
    - "E & E" (with Anthony Williams, in 2000 AD #1333, 2003)
    - "M.I.A." (with Anthony Williams, in 2000 AD #1334, 2003)
    - "Charon" (with Anthony Williams, in 2000 AD #1335, 2003)
    - "Down" (with Anthony Williams, in 2000 AD Prog 2004 and #1371–1379, 2003–2004)
  - "Old Soldiers" (by Dan Abnett and Anthony Williams, in 2000 AD #1432–1441, 2005)
  - "Mail Call" (by Dan Abnett and Anthony Williams, in 2000 AD #1486–1495, 2006)
