= Twilight of the Dead =

Twilight of the Dead may refer to:

- Twilight of the Dead (film), a film in development in George A. Romero's Night of the Living Dead film series
- "Twilight of the Dead", a song by the Misfits from The Devil's Rain
- Twilight of the Dead, a novel by David Bishop based on the Fiends of the Eastern Front comic series
- Twilight of the Dead, the original English title of the 1980 Italian supernatural horror film City of the Living Dead
