= Go-Machine =

Go-Machine is a science fiction comic strip that appeared in the British magazine 2000 AD. It was created by writer Al Ewing, and artist Richard Elson.

== Characters ==
- Mikel Keller and his unnamed wife
- The Central Directorate

== Plot ==
In the near future cybernetic implants are blurring the line between humans and robots. The story follows a participant in brutal cage fights between cyborgs who reaches the point where he crosses the line between man and machine and becomes part of the robotic underclass. Mikel betrays the human race and launches a coup wiping out the "core members" and declaring himself the new leader.

== Central Directorate ==
The Central Directorate is the ruling class in the unnamed city. They despise cyborgs and use them to fight in the Go-Machine tournament. Members include:

- The Central Director
- Anton Smythe - Assistant to the Central Director
- Ken & Brian - Go-Machine announcers

== Bibliography ==
- Go-Machine (by Al Ewing and Richard Elson, in 2000 AD #1496-1498, 2006)
