= Andy Lanning =

English comic book writer and inker

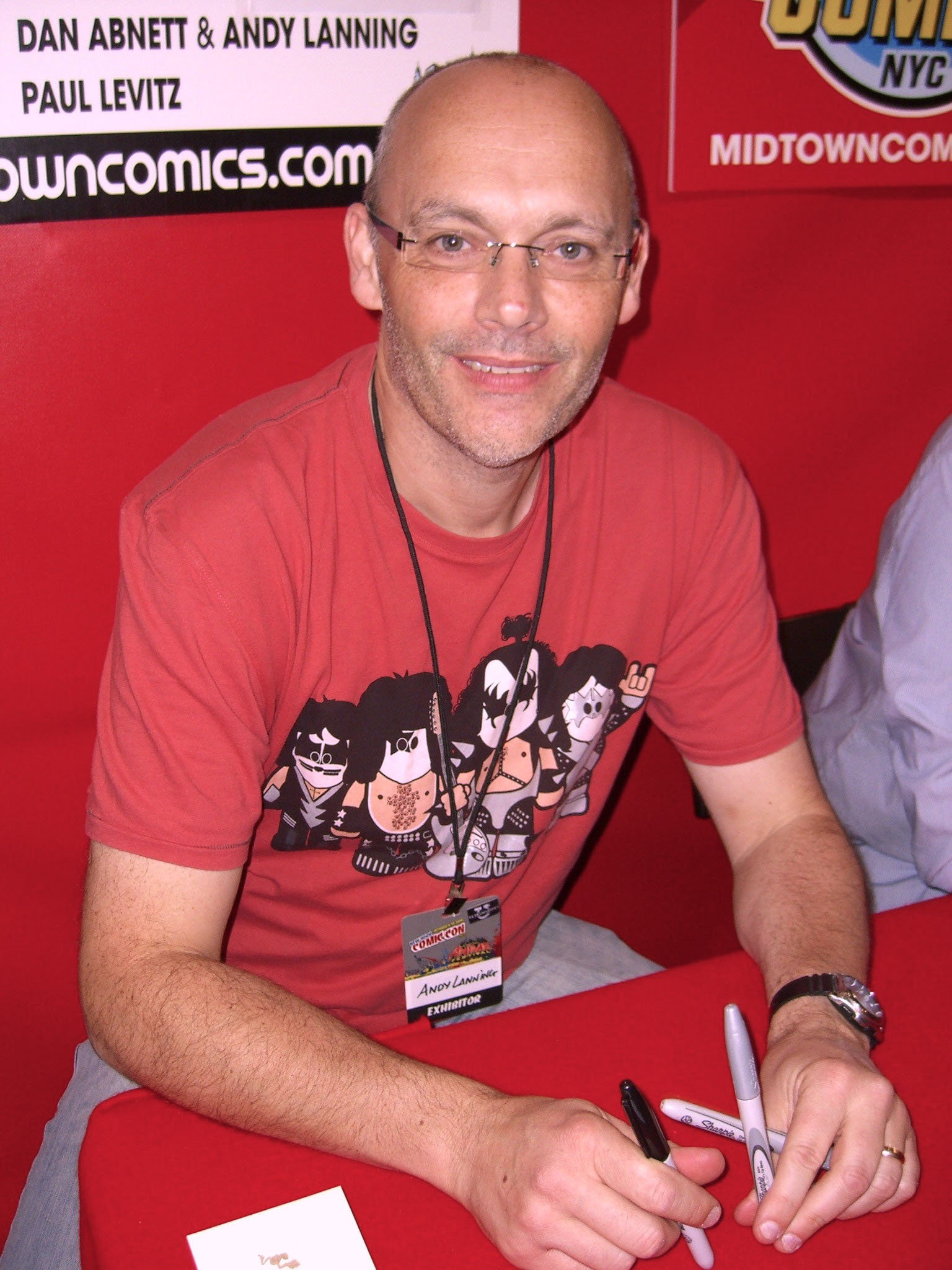
- Lanning at the New York Comic Con in Manhattan, 10 October 2010
- Born: 21 November 1963 (age 63)
- Areas: Writer, Inker
- Notable works: Legion of Super-Heroes; Nova; Sleeze Brothers

Andy Lanning is an English comic book writer and inker, known for his work for Marvel Comics and DC Comics, and for his collaboration with Dan Abnett.

== Career ==
Lanning works primarily at Marvel Comics and DC Comics as an inker. He has also pencilled books, such as his creation The Sleeze Brothers.

Lanning's writing has included his and Abnett's 2000 relaunch of DC's title Legion of Super-Heroes. The two co-created the Resurrection Man character with artist Jackson Guice in 1997.

Lanning and Abnett also collaborated on an ongoing Nova series for Marvel, which premiered in 2007. The duo previously authored a Nova miniseries as a tie-in for the Marvel crossover Annihilation, starring Richard Rider, now the only member of the Xandarian Nova Corps. This led into their piloting the "Annihilation: Conquest" storyline, and the core characters from this went on to form the new Guardians of the Galaxy.

Lanning teamed up with Abnett to relaunch The Authority, with Simon Coleby on art, as part of the World's End relaunch of the core Wildstorm titles.

It was announced at Wizard World Chicago in June 2008 that Abnett and Lanning had signed an exclusive deal with Marvel, which they hoped would give them time to work on the "cosmic" characters they dealt with, as well as more earth-based ones. The contract allows them to finish existing commitments, so they will be able to finish their fifteen issue run on The Authority. Their first major work which followed this was "War of Kings", which depicted the "cosmic" aftermath of Secret Invasion. He also wrote the three-issue Marvel/Top Cow crossover miniseries Fusion.

In 2020 Lanning collaborated with Ron Marz on the nine-issue DC Comics crossover storyline "Endless Winter", which would debut that December.

== Bibliography ==
- The Sleeze Brothers (with John Carnell, Epic Comics, 1989–1990)
- Judge Anderson: "Exorcise Duty" (with Dan Abnett, and art by Anthony Williams, in Judge Dredd Annual 1991)
- Death's Head II (inks, with Dan Abnett, and art by Liam Sharp, mini series and ongoing series, Marvel UK, 1991–1993)

Dreadlands Epic comics with co author Steve White and art by Phil Gascoine, 4 issue miniseries Epic comics 1992

- Digitek (with co-author John Tomlinson and art by Dermot Power, 4-issue mini-series, Marvel UK, 1992)
- Codename: Genetix (with co-author Graham Marks, pencils by Phil Gascoine and inks by Robin Riggs, 4-issue mini-series, Marvel UK, 1993)
- The Punisher: Year One (with co-author Dan Abnett, pencils by Dale Eaglesham and inks by Scott Koblish, 4-issue mini-series, Marvel Comics, 1994–1995)
- Force Works (with co-author Dan Abnett, Marvel Comics, 1994)
- Resurrection Man (with co-author Dan Abnett, and art by Jackson Guice, DC, 1997–1999)
- Batman: "Two Faces" (with co-author Dan Abnett, and art by Anthony Williams, one shot Elseworlds story, DC, 1998)
- Superman:
  - "Prime Time" (with co-author Dan Abnett, and art by Graham Higgins), a 10-page short story in Superman 80-Page Giant No. 1 (Feb. 1999)
  - "The Superman Monster" (with co-author Dan Abnett, and art by Tom Palmer and Anthony Williams, one-shot Elseworlds story, DC, 1999)
  - Return to Krypton (with co-author Dan Abnett, and art by Karl Kerschl, DC, 2004, Titan Books, ISBN 1-84023-798-8)
  - Strange Attractors (with co-authors Gail Simone and Dan Abnett, and art by John Byrne, DC, 2006, Titan Books, ISBN 1-84576-249-5, DC, ISBN 1-4012-0917-3)
- DC One Million 80-Page Giant (with co-author Dan Abnett, and art by Norm Breyfogle, DC, 1999)
- Legion Lost (inks, with co-author Dan Abnett, pencils by Oliver Coipel and Pascal Alike, DC, 2000–2001)
- Wonder Woman vol. 2 No. 174 (inks, 2001)
- The Legion (with co-author Dan Abnett, and art by Chris Batista, Chip Wallace, Leonard Kirk, Dave Cockrum, Tony Harris, Tom Feister, Paul Rivoche and Eric Wight, DC, 2001–2004, tpb, Foundations, collects #25–30, 176 pages, 2004, ISBN 1-4012-0338-8)
- Star Trek: Voyager: The Collection (with co-authors Dan Abnett and Jeffrey Moy, and art by Drew Struzan, 2002, Titan Books, ISBN 1-84023-320-6)
- Iceman (with co-author Dan Abnett, and art by Karl Kerschl, Marvel Comics, 2002, ISBN 0-7851-0889-0)
- iCandy (with co-author Dan Abnett, and art by Kalman Andrasofszky, DC Comics, 2003–2004)
- Majestic (with co-author Dan Abnett):
  - Volume 1: Strange New Visitor (with Karl Kerschl, collects Action Comics No. 811, Adventures of Superman No. 624, Superman No. 201 and Majestic 4-issue mini-series, 2004, DC, 2005, ISBN 1-4012-0483-X)
  - While You Were Out (with Neil Googe, Georges Jeanty and Trevor Scott, collects Majestic #1–7, Wildstorm, 2005, ISBN 1-4012-0850-9)
  - Volume 2 (with Neil Googe, Georges Jeanty and Trevor Scott, collects Majestic #8–12, Wildstorm, 2006, ISBN 1-4012-0989-0)
  - Volume 3: Final Cut (with Neil Googe, Diego Olmos, Kevin West and others, collects Majestic #13–17 and Wildstorm Winter Special, Wildstorm, January 2007)
- Annihilation: Nova (with co-author Dan Abnett, and art by Kev Walker, Marvel, 4-issue mini-series, 2006)
- The Texas Chainsaw Massacre (with co-author Dan Abnett, and art by Wesley Craig, Wildstorm, November 2006)
- Nova (with co-author Dan Abnett, Marvel Comics, 2007-ongoing)
- Guardians of the Galaxy (with co-author Dan Abnett and art by Paul Pelletier, Marvel Comics, May 2008, ongoing)
- The Authority #1–17 (with co-author Dan Abnett, and art by Simon Coleby, Wildstorm, 2008–2010) collected as:
  - World's End (136 pages, August 2009, ISBN 1-4012-2362-1)
  - Rule Britannia (192 pages, February 2010, ISBN 1-4012-2667-1)
- War of Kings (with co-author Dan Abnett and art by Paul Pelletier, Marvel Comics, March–August 2009)
- Fusion (with co-author Dan Abnett and pencils by Tyler Kirkham, Marvel Comics/Top Cow Productions, May 2009-ongoing)
- Realm of Kings (with co-author Dan Abnett):
  - Realm of Kings (with Mahmud Asrar/Leonardo Manco, one-shot, Marvel Comics, January 2010)
  - Realm of Kings: Imperial Guard (with Kev Walker, five-issue limited series, Marvel Comics, January–May 2010, tpb, 120 pages, June 2010, ISBN 0-7851-4597-4)
  - Realm of Kings: Inhumans (with pencils by Pablo Raimondi and inks by Andrew Hennessy, 5-issue limited series, Marvel Comics, January–May 2010)
- Hypernaturals (with co-author Dan Abnett and art by Brad Walker, Andres Guinaldo and Mark Irwin, 12-issue mini-series, BOOM! Studios, July 2012 – June 2013)

Preceded by Mike Baron	The Punisher writer 1992-1994 (with Dan Abnett)	Succeeded by Steven Grant
