= The Sleeze Brothers =

Marvel a comic book limited series

- Sleeze Brothers, issue #1, Epic Comics UK

Publication information
- Publisher: Marvel Comics
- Schedule: Monthly
- Format: Limited series
- Genre: Science fiction comedy
- Publication date: June 1989 – January 1990
- No. of issues: 6

Creative team
- Written by: John Carnell
- Artist: Andy Lanning

The Sleeze Brothers is a comic book limited series published by Marvel's Epic Comics imprint, between August 1989 and January 1990 (UK release dates), lasting for 6 issues. A collection of the six issues were later released in 1990, along with a final extended issue in 1991.

== Creation and publishing history ==
The Sleeze Brothers was written by John Carnell, with art by Andy Lanning. The characters were spun off from a Doctor Who comic strip by Carnell entitled "Follow That TARDIS!", published in Doctor Who Magazine #147 (April 1989). Many pointed out the clear similarities between the characters and Jake and Elwood Blues from the hit movie The Blues Brothers; Carnell instead claimed the characters were based on Lanning's cousins, Phil and Pete Carmichael, as well as Laurel and Hardy. The book was reputedly commissioned in response to Marvel president Jim Galton challenging Marvel UK to produce a title for mature readers.

The comics themselves are littered with contemporary parodies of both real and fictional characters, and occasional real life current affairs from 1989 and 1990. Additionally, the Sleeze Brothers storylines feature a variety of comical adult situations, and colourful (though not profane) language.

== Plot ==
El' Ape and Deadbeat Sleeze, two private eye brothers, are dysfunctional orphans who grew up in an orphanage for unwanted "boil in the bag" test tube babies. In a futuristic Earth rife with extra-terrestrials, pollution, crime and corruption they ply their trade in the seedy underbelly of a city called The Big Apple. They use amoral and often underhanded methods to get the results demanded by their eclectic clients.

Within the Marvel Comics multiverse, the Sleeze Brothers reality is designated as Earth-89547.

== Supporting characters ==
- Sergent Pigheadski: a two-headed humanoid swine police captain.
- President Sinatra: a part-cyborg amalgam of Frank Sinatra and Ronald Reagan.
- The Cosmos Father: an intergalactic mafia don.
- Wong: an Asian restaurateur thinly veiled as a humanoid feline.
- Papa Beatbox: the aging African American caretaker of the orphanage and the Sleeze Brothers' father figure.

== Additional appearances ==
- Doctor Who Magazine #147: "Follow that TARDIS! Part One"; reprinted in Doctor Who Classics Series V #1 and Doctor Who Classics vol. 9
- The Totally Stonking, Surprisingly Educational And Utterly Mindboggling Comic Relief Comic
- Epic Book 2: "Saturday Nite Special!"
- Elephantmen #16 (back-up story)

== Reception ==
The comic has been met with a negative reception. Reviewing the first issue for Amazing Heroes, Gary D. Robinson hoped there wouldn't be a second, scorning the series' derivative characters, poor jokes and comparing it negatively with garbage. The Sleeze Brothers #1 was Marvel's second-lowest selling title of September 1991, ahead of only ALF #47, and behind the 11th issue of both of the company's licensed Barbie titles.
