= Sinister Dexter =

British comics series

- Gunshark Vacation

Publication information
- Publisher: IPC Magazines / Rebellion Developments
- First appearance: 2000 AD Winter Special #7 (December 1995)
- Created by: Dan Abnett; David Millgate

In-story information
- Base(s): Bar None
- Member(s): Finnigan Sinister; Ramone Dexter

Sinister Dexter is a long-running comics series in British comics anthology 2000 AD, created by Dan Abnett and David Millgate.

== Overview ==
Set in the near future, it features the exploits of gun sharks (hitmen) Finnigan "Finny" Sinister and Ramone "Ray" Dexter in the city of Downlode, sprawled across Central Europe "like a hit and run victim". Occasional stories have taken place in other cities, or off planet. The size of Downlode is never specified in the strip, but it appears to stretch from Spain to eastern Europe.

The appearance of the city largely depends on the artist of the particular storyline: often it appears to be styled after the former soviet bloc, with many statues and wide boulevards, plus dilapidated cars such as Trabants and VW Beetles; however, in other strips the city looks clean and futuristic, like the Mega-City One of Judge Dredd stories in the same magazine. The story "London Town" shows that London and Great Britain still exist separate from Downlode.

Police drive generic saloon cars resembling Ford Crown Victorias, painted as the cars of the Los Angeles Police Department; black on bonnet and boot, with DCPD written on the white doors. In early strips the police used hovercars with "Polizei" written on the side, and this hovercraft technology appears in later stories, retrofitted to old cars such as Checker Cabs. Sinister and Dexter themselves drive a 1950s Edsel, this started out as a hardtop but in the story "Alibi of Broadway" had its roof torn off and was re-built as a convertible.

Advanced robots are occasionally seen in the stories, but appear to be very rare, and are usually controlled by humans and are unable to think for themselves. Some characters also have several cyborg implants, including Ramone himself who has a "Fony Headcase" television implanted into his eyes. In one story a malfunction in this temporarily gave him the ability to see in infra-red and detect a small hole in a crime-bosses' personal forcefield (referred to as a very rare and expensive technology).

The atmosphere of the stories suggests a time of economic recession. Sophisticated army hardware is sold off to the highest bidder, usually criminal gangs. Additionally many strips feature the city looking worn and run-down even in "rich" areas. In the story "Mother 'Lode and the Red Admiral" it is mentioned that Korea has developed cold fusion and become the world's richest nation.

Ramone uses a pair of "Ruger Nines", often drawn as silver 9mm pistols, or occasionally as revolvers. Sinister's "Minigun" (not to be confused with General Electric's Minigun) has been drawn differently by different artists: small pump-action shotgun, large double-barrelled revolver and small machine pistol. It can fire different kinds of bullets, including high explosives.

The title "Sinister Dexter" is a play on words; in Latin sinister means "left" or "on the left side" and dexter means "right" or "on the right side". The term is mentioned in the 1960s Discordian religious book Principia Discordia.

The initial inspiration for Sinister Dexter came from Samuel L. Jackson and John Travolta's characters in Pulp Fiction. However Dexter is designed to look like Wesley Snipes.

== Plot ==
In early stories the duo work as freelance hit-men, taking contracts from their "fact-totem", a PDA-like device, and killing people for money. The kingpin of crime in these early stories is Holy Moses Tanenbaum.

Eventually a large price is put on the head of Holy Moses himself, expecting Sinister and Dexter to take the contract he sends hit-men to kill them, after killing these they decide to take the contract, as their reputation would dictate they have to take the toughest jobs. After a battle which results in the duo both being nearly killed Holy Moses is killed and the person who put out the contract is revealed to be his wife, Demi Octavo.

A brief period of gang violence follows as various gangs attempt to take control of the city's underworld for themselves. Eventually The Czar, moblord of the Russian mafia calls a conference of gang leaders in an attempt to resolve the situation and hires Sinister and Dexter as security for the meeting. During the meeting, Sinister and Dexter discover that, naturally, every single gang has made plans to assassinate the other gang leaders. After these are fought off The Czar reveals "himself" to be a robot double outfitted with a close-focus nuke in its chest cavity. With the gang leaders dead The Czar is able to take over the underworld for himself.

Following the gang-war, Sinister and Dexter are hired by an accountant working for a Mr Bronsky "Ballpeen" Hammer as protection to 'expedite' the handover of the year-end accounts. The rendezvous between the accountant and Mr Hammer's men in Fred Quimby Municipal Park is violently interrupted by the Department of Taxation, causing the "Infamous Audit Showdown of '66". As a result of the carnage, Sinister and Dexter decide to take a holiday and The Czar recommends that they visit a nightclub in Asbestopol known as the Bawdwalk. At the club a pair of hired muscle known as Buddy Boom and Buddy Bing are threatening the club owner, Kilopatra, so Sinister and Dexter step in to help him and scare off the heavies, thus picking themselves up a holiday job.

Kilopatra sends the pair off to pay a visit to local mob-king Philly O'Fisch, as it was he who sent the two heavies after Kilopatra. Sinister and Dexter kill the two Buddies and warn Philly off Kilopatra under threat of taking one of the many contracts that Philly has on his head. When they return from this job, they run into Demi Octavo who is at the nightclub under a pseudonym, she tells the pair that the word spread that she was the one who put out the hit on Holy Moses Tanembaum so she decided to escape Downlode. The Czar suggested that she head to the Bawdwalk, which convinces Sinister and Dexter that The Czar has set them all up.

The pair invade Philly's island lair and kill him and all of his minions and return to Downlode to take out the Czar using a giant, cyborg alligator that ticks (referencing J. M. Barrie's Peter Pan). After this, Demi Octavo takes over as mob-queen and hires Sinister and Dexter as her personal guardians.

Stories from now on generally revolve around them protecting her empire, though occasionally they also take contracts from other people. During this time Demi's younger sister, Billi Octavo, decides to become a Gunshark, but a misunderstanding results in her killing some respected city dignitaries. During the ensuing police chase Sinister explains the unwritten "Gunshark Code" that they never kill cops or "innocents". Later Billi hacks into the police database and finds the dignitaries she killed were actually guilty of "perverted" crimes and it had been covered up. She released this data to the media and the police were forced to abandon the hunt. It is also revealed most rank-and-file police officers actually support Gunsharks, because they only kill other criminals which results in less criminals overall.

Later Dexter begins to see visions on his "Headcase" TV which suggest he is a wanted serial killer, the Blemvoi Butcher. It turns out the actual killer also has a "Headcase" and the signals have been transposed. The Butcher lures the pair and two police officers, including the "by-the-book" Tracey Weld, into a trap. Dexter kills the butcher and this eventually leads to his becoming romantically involved with Weld.

In Eurocrash, Demi sees her empire begin to crumble, so plans to marry Prince Guapo and unite the two biggest gangs and restore 'peace' to Downlode. The wedding gets hijacked by 'syns' (artificial humanoids) and Finnigan and Ramone fail to protect Demi, who dies. They both blame each other and walk away from their partnership.

Downlode Tales depicts Sinister and Dexter going their own ways, with Dexter joining the 'Ass Kickers' D.U.R. police unit to avoid jail, and Sinister putting together his 'whack pack' to avenge Demi's killers.

As the city once again descends into turmoil, the pair mentor a trainee Gunshark, Kal Kutter, who accompanies them on several adventures and eventually becomes a highly competent Gunshark in his own right.

Another mob boss, called Apellido, begins to take over the city and sends a huge squad of "bullet monkeys" (inferior but cheaper gunsharks) after Billi Octavo. Sinister attempts to get her out of the city but the other hitmen are chasing the two. Meanwhile, Dexter is with Detective Weld when he hears the news and rushes out of the house with his guns drawn. By chance he is seen by a police officer who tells him to freeze, before going to get out his handcuffs. Dexter misinterprets this as the officer going for his gun and kills him, thereby breaking the gunshark code. He escapes but doesn't get very far before being surrounded. Fearful of being tortured in prison a standoff ensues, and he is eventually shot by Weld. Sinister is last seen speeding out of the city, with a wounded Billi octavo in the car, still pursued by the bullet monkeys.

The story line at the end of 2005 (over the instalments "...and Death shall have no dumb minions" and "Festive Spirits") seemed to suggest that the deadly duo were both dead. However, this didn't stop some one-page "gag strips" from appearing in the Judge Dredd Megazine

This issue has now been addressed in passing as part of the twist in the, initially apparently unconnected, series Malone. The "Festive Spirits" story, in which both appeared as skeletal zombies who were apparently ignored by their old friends, is hinted at merely being one of Malone's dreams.

After surviving the showdown with his boss, Apellido, Sinister changed his face and took drugs to try to forget his past, fleeing offworld to Generica. It wasn't until Rocky Rhodes told him of his true identity that he returned to Downlode City to get revenge on Apellido making sure he knows that he's now alive. It was also revealed that Ramone also survived the shooting but was rendered quadriplegic.

Sinister allowed himself to be captured and was sent to the same prison as Ramone, with a plan to escape. After enlisting the help of two other prisoners, he executes the break-out and escapes with Ramone in a wheelchair. Heading to an old doctor friend it is revealed Ramone has been kept immobilised by an implant in his spine. With this removed, and surviving an attack by another Apellido hit-squad, they head for a run-down lock-up containing the Edsel and their old guns. They collect these and drive back into Downlode to again work as gunsharks, bringing the series full circle.

== Characters ==
- Finnigan Rapunzel Sinister, is a superstitious Irish hitman. He is married but separated, and not averse to philandering – considering his marriage over. Sinister is an accomplished poet, and has had volumes of his poetry published. He's also a closet cross-dresser, who enjoys wearing stockings (and occasionally women's lingerie) underneath his clothing.
- Ramone Algonquin Winnibago Dexter is Spanish, highly fashion conscious and also a womaniser. As the stories progress, he harbours doubts, and becomes somewhat jaded as to his career choice, but can see no alternative. He possesses formidable physical prowess, especially speed, which was gained as a result of his upbringing, training to become a matador like his father.
- Associates include:
  - Satan Brink (Deceased), fellow gunshark and street fighter from Tasmania
  - Anopheles Bunkum (Deceased), former police detective
  - Floppy Dick (Deceased), a friend of the hitmen
  - Billy Fix, a Tourettes sufferer in Downlode Penitentiary
  - Wendy Go, Rocky Rhodes' wife and barmaid at the Bar None
  - Carrie Hosanna, Finnigan's estranged wife and fellow gunshark
  - "Nervous" Rex Monday (Deceased), snitch and friend to the hitmen
  - Billi Octavo, younger sister of Demi and friend to the hitmen
  - Demi Octavo (Deceased), girlfriend of "Holy" Moses Tannebaum and former crime boss
  - Rocky Rhodes, a former cop and friend, owner of the Bar None
  - Lizzy Solemnis, a singer on the planet Generica
  - The Surgeon, a surgeon for the criminal underworld
  - Clayton Tushman, Sinister & Dexter's Lawyer
  - Tonto Vega (Deceased), a Sioux Indian and wannabe gunshark
  - Tracy Weld, a rookie cop and Ramone's girlfriend
  - Deakus Whisk, a bank robber in Downlode Penitentiary
  - SteamPunk Willy (Deceased), a former gunshark whose brain was encased in a robotic body, making him a cyborg.
  - Kal Cutter, former student of Sinister & Dexter, becomes a gun shark in his own right, and has several stories as the main character.
- Major villains include:
  - The Apellido Mob:
    - Apellido, current Crime Lord of Downlode City
    - Ronko, Apellido's chief enforcer. Described as being "like the bog roll: Rough, abrasive and hard on everyone's ass". Killed by Dexter.
    - Lars Maybach, Apellido's chief banker
    - Charlie Bigelow, one of Apellido's enforcer
    - Chevy Brakes, a minor enforcer
  - The Mover's Mob:
    - "Holy" Moses Tannebaum (The Mover), first Crime Lord of Downlode City. Was killed by the duo on the orders of Demi Octavo. Recently, another "Holy" Moses revealed himself to be "The Mover"
    - Miss Deeds, The Mover's assistant
    - John Croak, his Second-in-command
    - Cane Broadus, Kal Cutter's partner in crime
  - Telemachus Gore (Deceased), corrupt cop and former Crime Lord/Marshal
  - Serge, a gangster on the planet Generica

== Bibliography ==
As well as appearing in their own title they (and other Downlode characters) appeared in Downlode Tales and they also appeared in Metal Hammer magazine – everything written by Dan Abnett:

- Sinister Dexter:
  - "Sinister Dexter" (with David Millgate, in 2000 AD Winter Special No. 7, 1995)
  - "Nervous Rex" (with David Millgate, in 2000 AD No. 981, 1996)
  - "Curl Up And Die" (with Anthony Williams, in 2000 AD No. 982, 1996)
  - "Bratwurst Than Death" (with Tom Carney, in 2000 AD No. 983, 1996)
  - "Max Vactor" (with Anthony Williams, in 2000 AD No. 984, 1996)
  - "Death and Taxis" (with Charles Gillespie, in 2000 AD No. 985, 1996)
  - "Finnigan's Minigun" (with Tom Carney, in 2000 AD No. 986, 1996)
  - "The Eleventh Commandment" (with Charles Gillespie, in 2000 AD #988–989, 1996)
  - "Alibi of Broadway" (with Charles Gillespie, in 2000 AD #990–991, 1996)
  - "Wish Upon A Czar" (with Simon Davis, in 2000 AD #992–993, 1996)
  - "Family Man" (with Henry Flint, in 2000 AD No. 994, 1996)
  - "Executive Unction" (with Tom Carney and David Millgate, in 2000AD Sci-Fi Special 1996)
  - "Learning Kurv" (with David Millgate, in 2000 AD #1023, 1996)
  - "Gunshark Vacation" (with Simon Davis, in 2000 AD #1024–1031, 1997)
  - "Headcase" (with Marc Wigmore, in 2000 AD #1032, 1997)
  - "Murder 101" (with Simon Davis, in 2000 AD #1051–1061, 1997)
  - "Luck of the Irish" (with Paul Johnson, in 2000 AD #1062, 1997)
  - "Waiting For God Knows" (with Julian Gibson, in 2000 AD #1063, 1997)
  - "60 Seconds" (with Paul Johnson, in 2000 AD #1064, 1997)
  - "Market Forces" (with Marc Wigmore, in 2000 AD #1065, 1997)
  - "The Mating Game" (with Siku, in 2000 AD #1066, 1997)
  - "The Worst Fight We Was Ever In" (with Julian Gibson, in 2000 AD #1067, 1997)
  - "A Brief History of Gunsharks" (with Robert McCallum, in 2000 AD #1068, 1997)
  - "Last Orders" (with Marc Wigmore, in 2000 AD #1069, 1997)
  - "Pedal Power" (with Andrew Currie, in 2000 AD #1070, 1997)
  - "Things to do in Downlode When You're Dead" (with Julian Gibson, in 2000 AD #1071, 1997)
  - "Long to rain over us" (with Paul Johnson, in 2000 AD #1072, 1997)
  - "Roll With It" (with Julian Gibson, in 2000 AD #1073, 1997)
  - "Dead Cert" (with Steve Sampson, in 2000 AD #1074, 1997)
  - "Whack the Dinosaur" (with Siku, in 2000 AD #1075, 1997)
  - "Downlode Blues" (with Alex Ronald, in 2000 AD #1076, 1998)
  - "F.A.Q "(with Clint Langley, in 2000 AD #1076, 1998)
  - "Dressed to Kill" (with Siku, in 2000 AD #1078, 1998)
  - "Taking the Mick" (with Steve Yeowell, in 2000 AD #1079–1082, 1998)
  - "The Merry Weirdo" (with Allan Bednar as "Neal Brand", in 2000 AD #1083, 1998)
  - "London Town" (with Greg Staples, in 2000 AD #1084, 1998)
  - "The Big Stiff" (with Alex Ronald, in 2000 AD #1085, 1998)
  - "Lyrical Bollards" (with Simon Davis, in 2000 AD #1086, 1998)
  - "Hand Maid in Downlode" (with Andrew Currie, in 2000 AD #1087, 1998)
  - "To the Devil a Detour" (with Andy Clarke, in 2000 AD #1088–1089, 1998)
  - "Drop Dead Gorgeous" (with Greg Staples, in 2000 AD #1090–1091, 1998)
  - "Mother Lode and the Red Admiral" (with Calum Alexander Watt, in 2000 AD #1092–1095, 1998)
  - "Word Is" (with Ben Willsher as "Sheer", in 2000 AD # 1096, 1998)
  - "Tan Lines" (with Paul Johnson, in 2000 AD #1097, 1998)
  - "Tax Returns" (with David Millgate, in 2000 AD #1098, 1998)
  - "Bullfighting Days" (with Andy Clarke, in 2000 AD #1099, 1998)
  - "End of the Line" (with Paul Johnson, in 2000 AD # 1102, 1998)
  - "Slay Per View" (with Marc Wigmore (1–3), Julian Gibson (4–5), in 2000 AD # 1103–1107, 1998)
  - "Dead Man Whacking" (with Steve Yeowell, in 2000 AD #1108–1109, 1998)
  - "Death is a Lonely Donegan" (with Paul Johnson, in 2000 AD #1111, 1998)
  - "Anatomy of a Throwdown" (with Greg Staples, in 2000 AD #1112, 1998)
  - "Unofficial Business" (with Steve Sampson, in 2000 AD ##1113–1114, 1998)
  - "Sucker Punch" (with Sean Phillips, in 2000 AD #1115, 1998)
  - "Coptalk" (with Lol, in 2000 AD #1116, 1998)
  - "Smoke and Mirrors" (with David Bircham, in 2000 AD #1117–1122, 1998)
  - "Grey's Allergy" (with Patrick Woodrow, in 2000 AD #1123, 1998)
  - "'Twas the Fight Before Christmas" (with Steve Yeowell, in 2000 AD #1124, 1998)
  - "Automate" (with Paul Marshall, in 2000 AD # 1125, 1998)
  - "Reservations" (with Andy Clarke, in 2000 AD # 1126, 1999)
  - "Eurocrash" (with Simon Davis, in 2000 AD # 1127–1139, 1999)
- Downlode Tales:
  - "Tough Tushy" (with Sean Phillips, in 2000 AD #1126, 1999)
  - "Syn City" (with Siku, in 2000 AD #1127, 1999)
  - "Lone Shark" (with Trevor Hairsine, in 2000 AD #1144, 1999)
  - "The Ass Kickers" (with Paul Johnson, in 2000 AD #1145–1148, 1999)
  - "Scrubbers" (with Calum Alexander Watt, in 2000 AD #1149, 1999)
  - "The Whack Pack" (with Greg Staples, in 2000 AD #1152–1154, 1999)
  - "City on Fire" (with Chris Weston, in 2000 AD #1155–1160, 1999)
  - "Lock and 'Lode" (with Simon Davis, in 2000 AD #1161–1168, 1999)
- Sinister Dexter:
  - "Exit Wounds" (with Simon Davis, in 2000 AD prog 2000, 1999)
  - "Observations" (with Paul Johnson, in 2000 AD #1181, 2000)
  - "Mission to Mangapore" (with Andy Clarke, in 2000 AD #1189–1197, 2000)
  - "Life Behind Bars" (with Simon Davis, in 2000 AD #1198–1199, 2000)
  - "Feeding Frenzy" (with Simon Davis, in 2000 AD #1200–1202, 2000)
  - "Gun Play" (with Nigel Raynor/Stephen Baskerville, in 2000 AD #1203–1205, 2000)
  - "Shrink Rap" (with Andy Clarke, in 2000 AD #1206–1211, 2000)
  - "Lucky" (with Patrick Goddard (pencils), Lee Townsend (inks), in 2000 AD # 1220, 2000)
  - "Way Out West" (with Patrick Goddard (pencils), Lee Townsend (inks), in 2000 AD # 1221, 2000)
  - "Scene of the Crime (with Steve Roberts, in 2000 AD #1222, 2000)
  - "The Man in the Ion Mask" (with Simon Davis, in 2000 AD # 1223–1226, 2000)
  - "Money Shots" (with Andy Clarke, in 2000 AD # 1227–1228, 2000)
  - "Point Blanc" (with Andy Clarke, in 2000 AD #1231–1233, 2000)
  - "Bullet Time" (with Andy Clarke, in 2000 AD prog 2001, 2000)
  - "Dirty Habits" (with Steve Roberts, in 2000 AD #1234, 2001)
  - "Quality Time" (with Steve Roberts, in 2000 AD #1235, 2001)
  - "Barf Bag" (with Andy Clarke, in 2000 AD #1243–1245, 2000)
  - "Fully Laundromatic" (with Ian Richardson, in 2000 AD #1246–1248, 2000–2001)
  - "I Say Hello" (with Mark Pingriff, in 2000 AD #1264, 2001)
  - "Fear and Clothing" (with Paul Johnson, in 2000 AD #1265, 2001)
  - "On the Fidel" (with Steve Roberts, in 2000 AD #1266–1267, 2001)
  - "Black and White" (with Frazer Irving, in 2000 AD #1268, 2001)
  - "Night of the Living Dude" (with Cam Smith, in 2000 AD #1269, 2001)
  - "Sumo Chanted Evening" (with pencils by Jon Haward and inks by John Stokes, in 2000 AD #1270, 2001)
  - "Suddenly, Genghis" (with Siku, in 2000 AD #1271, 2001)
  - "Glock Around the Clock" (with Mark Pingriff, in 2000 AD #1272, 2001)
  - "Slay Bells in the Snow" (with Anthony Williams, in 2000 AD prog 2002, 2001)
  - "U R Here" (with Adrian Bamforth, in 2000 AD #1279, 2002)
  - "Narked for Death" (with Adrian Bamforth, in 2000 AD #1281, 2002)
  - "Tart au Citroen" (with Steve Roberts, in 2000 AD #1282, 2002)
  - "Poker Face" (with Ian Richardson, in 2000 AD #1283–84, 2002)
  - "Croak" (with Mark Pingriff, in 2000 AD #1290–92, 2002)
  - "House of Whacks" (with David Bircham, in 2000 AD #1294, 2002)
  - "Animal Firm" (with Cam Smith, in 2000 AD #1296–98, 2002)
  - "Deaky Poobar, we Hardly Knew Ye" (with Steve Parkhouse, in 2000 AD #1307–1310, 2002)
  - "Wising Off" (with Mike Collins, in 2000 AD #1311, 2002)
  - "Low Life" (with Steve Roberts, in 2000 AD #1312, 2002)
  - "The Off-Lode Experience" (with Simon Davis, in 2000 AD #1313-1321, 2002)
  - "Get Shirty" (with Simon Davis, in 2000 AD prog 2003, 2002)
  - "Relode" (with Ben Willsher, in 2000 AD #1322–1325, 2003)
  - "Bouncers" (with Steve Roberts, in Judge Dredd Megazine No. 202, 2003)
  - "Dead Famous" (with Steve Roberts, in Judge Dredd Megazine No. 203, 2003)
  - "Gag Reflex" (with Steve Roberts, in Judge Dredd Megazine No. 204, 2003)
  - "Big Game" (with Cam Smith, in 2000 AD #1343–1344, 2003)
  - "Write from Wrong" (with Steve Yeowell, in 2000 AD #1345–1347, 2003)
  - "Oh Kal Cutter" (with Andy Clarke, in 2000 AD #1348, 2003)
  - "Junk Bond" (with Simon Davis, in 2000 AD #1356–1361, 2003)
  - "Five Go Postal in Downlode" (with Simon Davis, in 2000 AD prog 2004, 2003)
  - "Just Business" (with Andy Clarke, in 2000 AD #1380–1382, 2004)
  - "Job Jobbed" (with Andy Clarke, in 2000 AD #1383–1385, 2004)
  - "Scare Tactics" (with Cam Smith, in 2000 AD #1397–1399, 2004)
  - "Off-Ramp" (with Jack Lawrence, in 2000 AD #1415, 2004)
  - "Dunce Macabre" (with Simon Davis, in 2000 AD prog 2005, 2004)
  - "Latte Animals" (with Mark Pingriff, in 2000 AD #1429–1430, 2005)
  - "Vircade" (with John McCrea, in 2000 AD #1431, 2005)
  - "Life's A Beach" (with Steve Yeowell, in 2000 AD #1433–1435, 2005)
  - "Slow Train to Kal Cutter" (with Simon Davis, in 2000 AD #1443–1449, 2005)
  - "...and Death Shall Have No Dumb Minions" (with Simon Davis, in 2000 AD #1459–1468, 2005)
  - "Festive Spirits" (with Simon Davis, in 2000 AD prog 2006, 2005)
  - "A Night Off" (with Steve Roberts, in Judge Dredd Megazine No. 242, 2006)
  - "High Tide" (with Steve Roberts, in Judge Dredd Megazine No. 243, 2006)
  - "Places to Go, People to Do" (with Anthony Williams, in 2000 AD #1508–1513, 2006)
  - "Pros and Cons" (with Ian Richardson (1–3), Simon Coleby (3) and Anthony Williams (4), in 2000 AD #1514–1517, 2006)
  - "Christmas Time" (with Simon Davis, in 2000 AD prog 2007, 2006)
  - "The Last Thing I Do" (with Simon Davis, in 2000 AD #1528–1533, 2007)
  - "The Doctor is In" (with Simon Coleby, in 2000 AD #1535–1538, 2007)
  - "Normal Service" (with Anthony Williams, in 2000 AD #1539, 2007)
  - "Life is an Open Casket " (with Anthony Williams, in 2000 AD #1560–1565, 2007)
  - "Inner Waldorf Hire and Dice" (with Simon Davis, in 2000 AD prog 2008, 2007)
  - "Yer Ass From Yer Elbow" (with Anthony Williams, in 2000 AD #1589–1590, 2008)
  - "The Bournemouth Identity" (with Anthony Williams, in 2000 AD #1591–1594, 2008)
  - "The Importance of Fleeing Ernest" (with Anthony Williams, in 2000 AD #1595–1599, 2008)
  - "Ray and Finny's Daze of Christmas" (with Anthony Williams in 2000 AD prog 2009, 2008)
  - "Wish You Were Here" (with Anthony Williams and Rob Taylor, in 2000 AD #1642–1646, 2009)
  - "Rush From Her With Love" (with Anthony Williams and Rob Taylor, in 2000 AD #1647–1648, 2009)
  - "Watch with Motherfunter" (with Anthony Williams and Rob Taylor, in 2000 AD #1649, 2009)
  - "Better the Devil Ye Know" (with Anthony Williams and Rob Taylor, in 2000 AD #1661–1665, 2009)
  - "The Why-Shaped Cut" (with Anthony Williams and Rob Taylor, in 2000 AD #1693–1698, 2010)
  - "Are You Being Severed" (with Anthony Williams and Rob Taylor, in 2000 AD #1709–1714, 2010)
  - "Apocalypse Shtick: Charon's Crossing (with Anthony Williams, in 2000 AD #1740–1744, 2011)
  - "Apocalypse Shtick: Inverse Ninjas Rule (with Anthony Williams, in 2000 AD #1745, 2011)
  - "Apocalypse Shtick: The Dead-End Job (with Anthony Williams, in 2000 AD #1746–1749, 2011)
  - "Apocalypse Shtick: Dirty Deeds Done Dirt Cheap (with Anthony Williams, in 2000 AD #1761–1763, 2011)
  - "Apocalypse Shtick: Now & Again" (with Anthony Williams, in 2000 AD prog 2012, 2011)
  - "Witless Protection: Malone Again" (with John Burns, in 2000 AD #1832–1835, 2013)
  - "Witless Protection: In Plain Shite" (with John Burns, in 2000 AD #1836–1840, 2013)
  - "Witless Protection: Last Rights (with Simon Davis, in 2000 AD #1841–1843, 2013)
  - "The Generican Dream: Room Only (with PJ Holden, in 2000 AD prog 2014, 2013)
  - "The Generican Dream: Gun Shy (with Smudge, in 2000 AD #1874–1879)
  - "The Generican Dream: Congo (with Jake Lynch, in 2000 AD #1889–1892)
  - "Thee Taking of the Michael (with Patrick Goddard, in 2000 AD #1951–1956)
  - "Blank Ammo (with Simon Davis, in 2000 AD #1961)
  - "Replica (with Mark Sexton, in 2000 AD #2000)
- Metal Hammer:
  - "Axed" (with Andy Clarke, in Metal Hammer)
  - "Dead Famous" (with Steve Roberts, in Metal Hammer)
  - "A Question of Taste" (with Steve Roberts, in Metal Hammer)

=== Collected editions ===
The comics have been collected into trade paperbacks by Rebellion.

Volumes published include:

- Gunshark Vacation (collects "Gunshark Vacation", 128 pages, Rebellion Developments, September 2004, ISBN 1-904265-16-2; DC Comics, October 2004, ISBN 1-4012-0391-4)
- Murder 101 (collects 2000 AD #1051–1082, 160 pages, Rebellion, January 2005, ISBN 1-904265-26-X; DC Comics, ISBN 1-4012-0575-5)
- Slay Per View (collects 2000 AD #1084–1124, 240 pages, Rebellion, May 2005, ISBN 1-904265-38-3; DC Comics, June 2005, ISBN 1-4012-0587-9)
- Eurocrash (collects 2000 AD #1125–1139, Prog 2000, #1181 and #1189–1999, 160 pages, Rebellion, March 2009, ISBN 1-905437-93-5)
- Money Shots (collects 2000AD #1200–1211, 1220–1228, 1231–1235, 1243-1248 and Prog 2001, 192 pages, Rebellion, October 2009, ISBN 1-906735-17-4)

The "Downlode Tales" story arcs were collected into three reprint magazines that came polybagged with issues 330, 334, and 335 of Judge Dredd Megazine.

The stories illustrated by Andy Clarke were also republished by American company IDW Publishing in 7 volumes between December 2013 and June 2014; these were collected in a trade paperback published in the August 2014.
