= Codex Pictures =

British film production company

Codex Pictures Ltd
- Company type: Private Limited Company
- Industry: Animation
- Founded: 10 October 2008
- Defunct: 10 March 2013
- Fate: Dissolved
- Headquarters: London, United Kingdom
- Area served: Worldwide
- Key people: Vanessa Chapman (Managing Director); David Kerney (Head of Production); Bob Thompson (CEO of Good Story Productions – Strategic Partner)
- Products: Motion pictures
- Website: http://www.codexpictures.com

Codex Pictures Limited was a British film production company. Codex Pictures was a private limited company founded in 2008 and dissolved in 2013.

Codex Pictures produced Ultramarines under licence from Games Workshop, working in association with Good Story Productions Ltd. and Montreal based POP6 Studios.

== Productions ==
Production of Ultramarines was announced at the 2009 Games Day at the Birmingham NEC.

Ultramarines is a 70-minute sci-fi thriller CGI movie set in Games Workshop's fictional Warhammer 40,000 universe and based around the Ultramarines Chapter of Space Marines. The screenplay was written by Black Library author Dan Abnett.
