= Ultramarines: A Warhammer 40,000 Movie =

- DVD cover
- Directed by: Martyn Pick
- Written by: Dan Abnett
- Produced by: Bob Thompson; David Kerney
- Starring: Terence Stamp; Sean Pertwee; John Hurt; Donald Sumpter
- Cinematography: Darren Lovell
- Edited by: David Lewis Smith
- Music by: Adam Harvey
- Production companies: Good Story Productions; Codex Pictures; POP6
- Distributed by: Anchor Bay Entertainment
- Release date: 13 December 2010
- Running time: 70 minutes
- Country: United Kingdom
- Language: English

Ultramarines: A Warhammer 40,000 Movie is a 2010 British adult animated action science fiction film set in Games Workshop's fictional Warhammer 40,000 universe and based on the Ultramarines Chapter of the Space Marines. Terence Stamp, Sean Pertwee, and John Hurt head the cast of voice actors, and the screenplay was written by Black Library author Dan Abnett.

== Plot ==
The film opens with footage from the planet Mithron with a group of Space Marines of the Imperial Fists Chapter under attack from an unknown enemy. A Space Marine by the name of Nidon is told to protect "the Codex" and races to obey his orders, just before a fireball engulfs them all. Elsewhere, aboard a Space Marine Strike Cruiser, Brother Proteus and Captain Severus of the Ultramarines Chapter's 2nd Company spar in a training duel. Proteus manages to disarm Severus; however, he quickly escapes Proteus's grasp and in turn defeats him, proclaiming that a Space Marine never yields. Following this, Proteus and the other newly initiated members of the 2nd Company's Ultima Squad are then shown a sacred weapon in their ship's reclusium, a Relic Thunder Hammer. The Captain and his right-hand man, Apothecary Pythol, lead the initiates in a swearing-in ceremony on the Hammer. With the ceremony finished, Ultima Squad prepare themselves for their first mission as a squad—a sortie to the planet of Mithron.

In orbit above the planet, Captain Severus departs the cruiser with only Pythol and the ten-strong Ultima Squad as support, all of whom are highly eager to prove themselves in battle finally. En route to the planet's surface, Severus addresses the squad, informing them of the distress call received shortly before all contact with the planet was lost, and how it is still unclear whether it is automated or not. Soon enough, they arrive on the tough and unforgiving desert surface of Mithron, and head in the direction of the only location of importance on the planet: a shrine guarded by a full company of one hundred Marines from the Imperial Fists. En route to the shrine, Proteus senses something shadowing them and opens fire on it, but when the others fail to find any evidence of their supposed pursuer, they quickly dismiss his concerns as just nerves, something which Proteus denies. Soon afterward though, Ultima Squad discovers that a terrible battle has indeed taken place, with the garrison force annihilated and the planet's Imperial shrine desecrated. It is also evident that the forces of Chaos are responsible, and against Pythol's advice to retreat, Severus decides they must continue the mission to search for any remaining survivors.

While approaching the ruins, the Ultramarines are ambushed by the Black Legion. Three of the Ultramarines (squad leader Veteran Sergeant Crastor, Brother Lycos, and Brother Boreas) are killed, but the ambush is thwarted. The squad then continues on, and eventually makes it inside the shrine. While traveling through a dark passage, though, they are attacked by a Daemon Prince, which kills Brother Maxillius and grapples with Severus, causing them both to fall through a wall and down a ravine. With Severus gone and Crastor dead, command of the squad then falls to Proteus, who decides to continue with the mission. Progressing to the reliquary at the shrine's summit, they find Chaplain Carnak and Brother Nidon, the sole surviving members of the Imperial Fists' 5th Company. They reveal they have been protecting the Liber Mithrus, an ancient sacred Codex given by The God-Emperor of Mankind himself to the chapter upon its founding. Ultima Squad agrees to help escort the book to safety, but Brother Verenor and Proteus remain suspicious, questioning just how the two Imperial Fists have managed to survive for so long by themselves. As Ultima Squad retreat to the extraction point, they are attacked by a huge force of Chaos Space Marines. During the fight they suffer heavy casualties, with Brother Remulus being killed and Brother Junor sacrificing himself by detonating his damaged flamethrower to hold off the Chaos Marines. Just as they are about to be overwhelmed, Captain Severus suddenly reappears and aids their escape.

Back on board, Proteus confides to Severus his suspicions of Carnak and Nidon, believing that they may have been tainted by Chaos. They confront the Imperial Fists, with Severus taking the book and discovering that it is blank. When Brother Hypax enters the room while bearing the Ultramarines' standard, it ignites, indicating the presence of Chaos. Severus declares that Carnak has been tainted and kills him. Nidon becomes enraged and attacks Severus, but is easily thrown off and knocked unconscious. Hypax, however, notes that the standard is still burning despite Carnak's death, indicating that Carnak was not in fact possessed and the Daemon is still alive. At this point, Severus then suddenly turns and attacks those present, revealing that not only was his body possessed by the Daemon he had fought earlier, but also revealing that the whole mission was a trap staged by the forces of Chaos to allow the book to be taken off-world. Before it can kill more of them, an enraged Hypax charges the Daemon with the standard, and forces it into the armoury. When Proteus and Nidon eventually regain consciousness, they find both Hypax and Brother Decius slain, along with an injured Pythol. Accompanied by Nidon, the three confront the Daemon in the ship's reclusium where they discover the seemingly blank Liber Mithrus is actually a disguised book of arcane knowledge. The Demon possessing Severus then twists his body into its true form and reveals its plans to transfer itself into Proteus' body in order to infiltrate the Ultramarines' homeworld of Macragge where it will then use the book to open a warp gate and destroy the planet. Before it can carry out its plan though, Pythol arrives and manages to save Proteus from being possessed at the cost of his own life. Using the diversion, Proteus then takes the Thunder Hammer from the reclusium to kill Severus and banish the Daemon possessing him back into the Warp. Sometime later, it is shown that Proteus has been promoted, with Verenor now as his second-in-command, and the final scene mirroring the opening one, with Proteus swearing in new recruits on the sacred hammer.

== Cast ==
- Terence Stamp – Captain Severus
- John Hurt – Chaplain Carnak
- Sean Pertwee – Brother Proteus, a strong willed Ultramarine and probably the most capable leader and soldier who took command after the loss of Captain Severus and Sergeant Crastor.
- Steve Waddington – Brother Verenor, a Space Marine who is always poking holes in stories and is quick to point out the logic of every situation
- Donald Sumpter – Apothecary Pythol, The oldest member of the squad and somewhat beaten down by all the fighting he's done. He educates the recruits of Ultima Squad that "War is not about glory. War is about victory.”
- Johnny Harris – Brother Nidon
- Ben Bishop – Sergeant Crastor, Brother Junor and Brother Remulus
- Gary Martin – Brother Hypax, Brother Maxillius and Brother Decius
- Christopher Finney – Brother Boreas and Brother Lycos

== Production ==
Production of Ultramarines was announced at the 2009 Games Day at the Birmingham NEC, and the film was made by UK-based production company Codex Pictures under license from Games Workshop, working in association with Good Story Productions Ltd and Montreal based POP6 Studios.

== Animation ==
Ultramarines used Image Metrics animated facial capture techniques. Image Metrics' previous credits include Grand Theft Auto IV, Assassin's Creed II, NBA 2K10, Black Eyed Peas’ video "Boom Boom Pow" and Harry Potter and the Order of the Phoenix. A short teaser sequence was released on Saturday 29 May 2010, on the official film website and simultaneously at the MCM Expo at ExCeL London. The second trailer for Ultramarines was premiered at UK Games Day at the NEC, Birmingham Sunday 26 September 2010.

== Release ==
The Special Edition DVD accompanied by a 32-page hardback graphic novel, Hard Choices 'What happened on Algol?', written by Dan Abnett with art by renowned comic book artist David Roach, was to be released worldwide on 29 November 2010. However, the release of the DVD was delayed due to a production problem, as reported by Codex Pictures on 29 November 2010. The exact details of the problem have not been released; however, Codex Pictures reported that the problem was not with the DVD, but with one of the other components of the collector's edition DVD.

Codex Pictures had then announced that the shipping of the film would begin in the week of 6 December 2010, and that they intended to prioritise the dispatch of the film to their customers, according to the date they received the order, with the last dispatch taking place by the end of the week. This, however, was not the final resolution to the situation as there were still many people who had pre-ordered as far back as October 2010 and not received their package as of 27 January 2011. This matter was confused further by Codex Pictures's own site still offering the DVD for sale, and not offering clear warning that there remained a problem regarding the supply of the DVD.

== Reception ==
Advanced preview screenings of Ultramarines: The Movie received generally favourable responses from a pool of selected viewers. The film itself has received mixed reviews, however, with the CGI and animations considered sub par by some. The CGI makes the Ultramarines seem "tall" and "thin", whilst much of the "set" of the film is conveniently shrouded in dust. Another complaint has been that, given the detail and creativity put into Warhammer artwork, the film looks and feels cheap, rushed, and simple.

After release the film received mixed reviews. Some critics praised the story, saying that it is short but well paced and with good character interaction while others said the story was simplistic, slow to get to the action, and lacked a sense of mystery and importance. The music has been seen as a positive aspect of the film, with one reviewer saying that the score was "ominous and awe-inspiring by turn; never over-powering but lending a real atmosphere to the film". The film's attention to visual detail was also noted, with one reviewer stating, "Every piece of stained glass in the background tells a story".

It earned $225,205 from domestic home video sales.
