= Bec & Kawl =

British comic strip

Publication information
- Publisher: Rebellion Developments
- Schedule: Weekly
- Formats: Original material for the series has been published as a strip in the comics anthology(s) 2000 AD.
- Genre: Horror

Creative team
- Writer(s): Simon Spurrier
- Artist(s): Steve Roberts
- Letterer(s): Ellie De Ville; Annie Parkhouse
- Editor(s): Matt Smith

Reprints
- Collected editions
- Bloody Students: ISBN 1-904265-66-9

Bec & Kawl is a comic strip appearing in the British anthology 2000 AD, written by Simon Spurrier and drawn by Steve Roberts. The stories combine elements of horror and the supernatural (with the occasional alien) with a large dose of humour which has received a mixed reaction from readers.

== Characters ==
- Becky Miller (Bec) - student and part-time witch.
- Jarrod Kawl (Kawl) - a usually stoned hanger on who either accidentally gets the pair into trouble or accidentally gets them out of it (or both).
- Pierre Romanov - the greatest Pest Control Expert who ever lived (in Pest Control).

== Plot ==
Bec and Kawl are art students who dabble in the occult and this leads them into a whole range of adventures from meeting the tooth fairies and defending the Earth from alien traffic cones.

The stories are often parodical, taking the form of humorous versions of staple themes of fantasy, science fiction and horror. The heavy use of parody also extends to dialogue and characters.

== Influences ==
The strip is most obviously influenced by popular culture, in particular movies and comic books. Indeed, many of the minor characters are directly based upon already-existing fictional creations such as Harry Potter, Hellblazer and the Sandman.

The idea of two young people living a pop culture-heavy existence in a shared flat bears a strong resemblance to the Channel 4 sitcom Spaced.

== Bibliography ==
They have only appeared within their own strip:

- "and the Mystical Mentalist Menace!" (in 2000 AD #1290-1291, May 2002)
- "Beccy Miller's Diary" (in 2000 AD #1292-1293, May 2002)
- "Enlightenment" (in 2000 AD #1327, Feb. 2003)
- "eeevil.com" (in 2000 AD #1328-1330, Feb. 2003)
- "Pest Control" (in 2000 AD #1351-1354, Jul. 2003)
- "Toothache" (in 2000 AD #1383-1386, Mar. 2004)
- "Hell To Pay" (in 2000 AD #1401-1404, Aug. 2004)
- "Attack of the Cones" (in 2000 AD #1437-1440, May 2005)
- "Freakshow" (in 2000 AD #1477-1481, May 2006)

=== Collected editions ===
All the stories have been collected in one trade paperback:

- Bec and Kawl: Bloody Students (Rebellion, Aug. 2006, 176 pages, ISBN 1-904265-66-9)
