= Dan Abnett =

British comic book writer and novelist (born 1965)

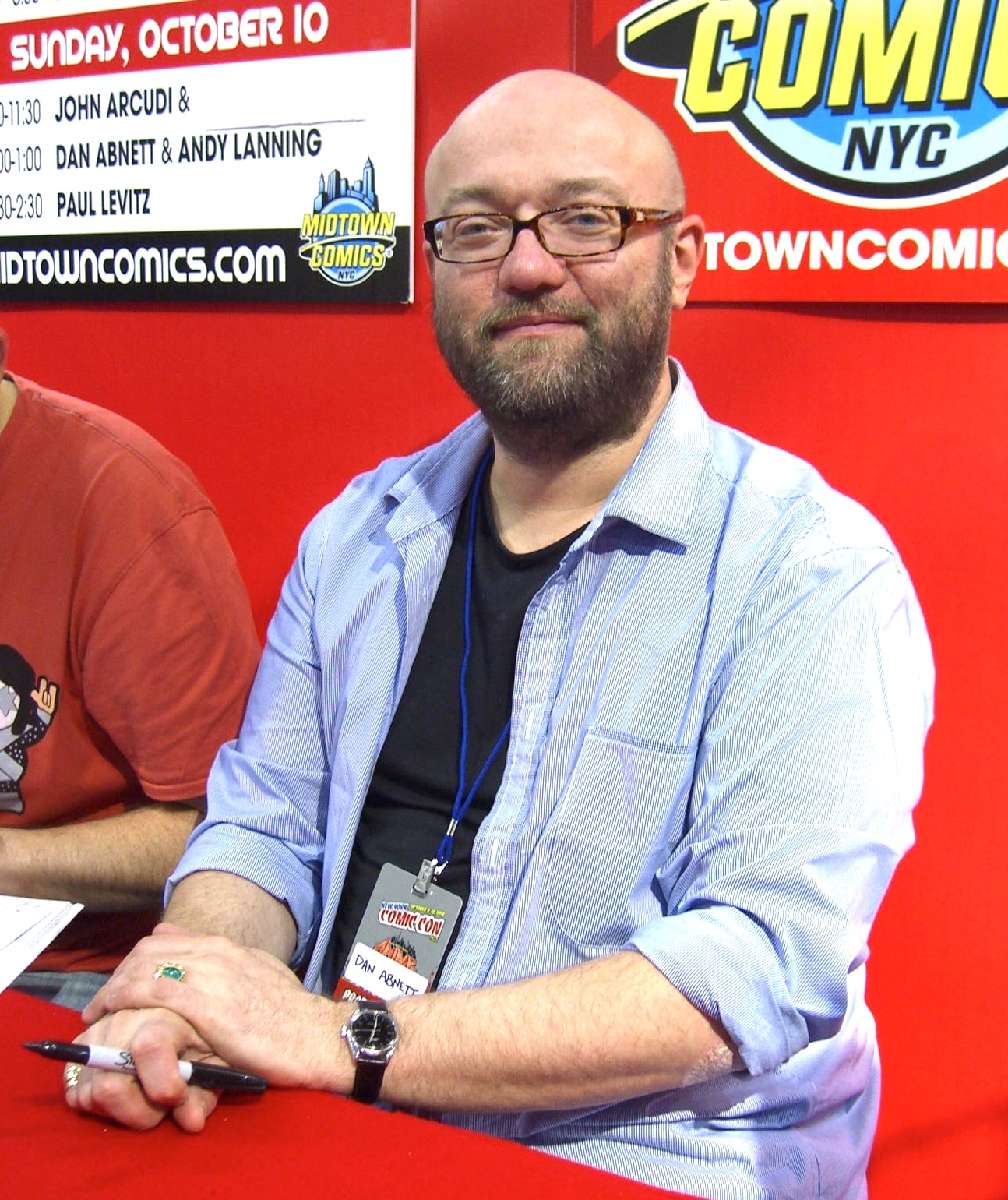
- Abnett at the Midtown Comics booth at the New York Comic Con in Manhattan, 10 October 2010
- Born: Daniel P. Abnett; 12 October 1965 (age 60); Rochester, Kent, England
- Education: St Edmund Hall, Oxford
- Occupations: Comic book writer, novelist
- Writing career
- Period: 1988–present
- Genres: Comic book, science fiction
- Notable awards: National Comics Award for Best Writer in Comics Today (2003)
- Website: theprimaryclone.blogspot.com

Daniel P. Abnett (/ˈæbnɪt/ AB-nit; born 12 October 1965) is an English comic book writer and novelist. He has been a frequent collaborator with fellow writer Andy Lanning, and has worked on books for both Marvel Comics, and their UK imprint, Marvel UK, since the 1990s, and also 2000 AD. He has also contributed to DC Comics titles, and his Warhammer Fantasy and Warhammer 40,000 novels and graphic novels for Games Workshop's Black Library now run to several dozen titles and have sold over two million copies. In 2009 he released his first original fiction novels through Angry Robot books.

== Early life ==
Daniel P. Abnett was born in Rochester, Kent, on 12 October 1965. Abnett read English and matriculated at St Edmund Hall, Oxford in 1984, and graduated from there in 1987.

== Career ==
As one of the more prolific 2000 AD writers, Abnett was responsible for the creation of one of the comic's better known and longest-running strips, Sinister Dexter. Other original stories include Black Light, Badlands, Atavar, Downlode Tales, Sancho Panzer, Roadkill, Wardog based on the game of the same name, Kingdom and Brink. Abnett has also contributed to some of the comic's major ongoing series, including Judge Dredd, Durham Red and Rogue Trooper.

His work for Marvel includes runs on Guardians of the Galaxy, Death's Head 2, Battletide, Knights of Pendragon (all of which he co-created), The Punisher, War Machine, Annihilation: Nova and various X-Men titles, as well as several stories for the Doctor Who Magazine comic strip.

At DC he is probably best known for his 2000 relaunch of Legion of Super-Heroes as the limited series Legion Lost and then the ongoing series The Legion. His work for DC is usually co-written with Andy Lanning and they are often referred to as DnA. The two co-created the Resurrection Man character with artist Jackson Guice in 1997.

For Dark Horse Comics he co-wrote Planet of the Apes: Blood Lines with Ian Edginton, as well a penning Lords of Misrule and HyperSonic.

Abnett's First & Only was one of the first novels published by Games Workshop's Black Library. His other novels set in Games Workshop's Military science fiction-themed Warhammer 40,000 universe include the Gaunt's Ghosts series, the Eisenhorn and Ravenor trilogies, and more recently, as part of the Horus Heresy series, the SF best-sellers Horus Rising, Legion, Prospero Burns, Know No Fear and The End and the Death Volumes I, II & III. He has also authored four comic strip series, collected as graphic novels, for Games Workshop's Black Library imprint in the volumes Damnation Crusade, Lone Wolves, Inquisitor Ascendant and Titan.

Having written the Doctor Who audio dramas The Harvest and Nocturne for Big Finish's series. He also authored Everyone Says Hello, an audio drama based on Torchwood. He authored a 'Border Princes, a Torchwood novel, and the framing device of the Doctor Who anthology The Story of Martha.

In 1994, he wrote a promotional comic to promote the opening of the Nemesis roller coaster at Alton Towers.

=== 2000s work ===
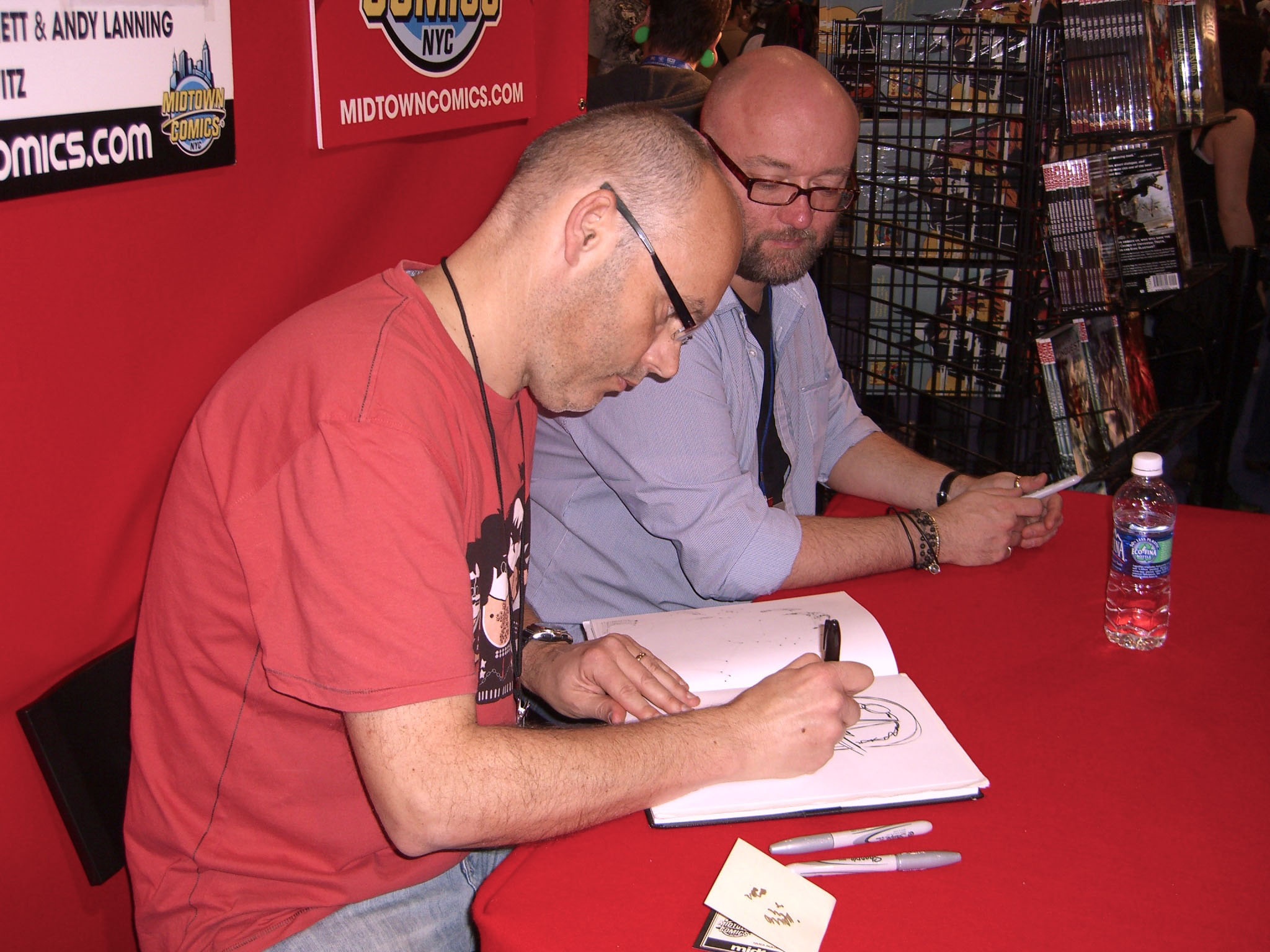
Abnett and frequent collaborator Andy Lanning at the Midtown Comics booth at the New York Comic Con, 10 October 2010.

At 2000 AD he finished the final book of The V.C.s and started Black Atlantic in the Judge Dredd Megazine, which was drawn by Steve Roberts (seen working on Bec & Kawl) in black and white.

In 2008 Abnett and Lanning took over The Authority as part of the World's End relaunch of the core Wildstorm titles.

In addition, Abnett has done a lot of work on Marvel's "cosmic" characters. They expanded on their work in Annihilation: Nova and Nova, and piloted the next big event Annihilation: Conquest. They said "we were approached by Andy Schmidt, who edited the first 'Annihilation' event, and asked to pilot the next event, which Bill Rosemann is editing." They ended up writing the Prologue, the Nova series crossover and the main Annihilation: Conquest limited series. The characters then became the core of a new Guardians of the Galaxy.

In June 2008, Abnett and Lanning signed an exclusive deal with Marvel, which they hoped would give them time to work on the "cosmic" characters they have been dealing with, as well as more earth-based ones. The contract allowed them to finish existing commitments, so they will be able to finish their fifteen issue run on The Authority. In addition Marvel has allowed the contract to include "a couple of exceptions that are not direct competition, for example, Dan's 2000AD work in the UK and his Games Workshop novels." The first major work to emerge after this deal will be War of Kings, a crossover storyline, emerging from Secret Invasion, that pitches Black Bolt (and the Inhumans) against Gabriel Summers (and the Shi’ar Empire) but also draws in other teams and characters, including Nova, the Guardians of the Galaxy and the Starjammers. This then led straight into "Realm of Kings" which deals with how the different groups deal with the fallout from the events in War of Kings and this, in turn, was followed by The Thanos Imperative. DnA have also written an Iron Man/Thor limited series.

He and Lanning have also written Fusion, a crossover series between Marvel and Top Cow.

He also started Insurrection, a series in Judge Dredd Megazine that aimed "to bring to the Dredd Universe something of the epic war-in-space scale of the stuff I write for Warhammer 40K."

Abnett wrote the screenplay for Games Workshop and Codex Pictures's CGI film Ultramarines released in 2010.

=== 2010s work ===
Abnett concluded Insurrection and began a new series in the same milieu, Lawless, also in the Judge Dredd Megazine. Meanwhile, in 2000 AD he has continued Kingdom, contributed Grey Area and began another new series, Brink. He also began writing both the Aquaman and Titans titles for the DC Rebirth branding, including the crossover storyline "The Lazarus Contract", which he coauthored with Christopher Priest and Benjamin Percy.

=== Original fiction ===
On 19 March 2009, HarperCollins' science fiction, fantasy and horror imprint, Angry Robot, announced the acquisition of three original novels by Abnett. They were Triumff: Her Majesty's Hero, a story set in the alternative history reign of Elizabeth XXX and Embedded, a near future war story with a journalist protagonist, which would have a follow-up set in the same setting. Only two novels were published.

== Bibliography ==
Dan Abnett has been writing comics and novels since the mid-1980s, producing hundreds of comic stories and dozens of novels.

Preceded by Mike Baron	The Punisher writer 1992-1994 (with Andy Lanning)	Succeeded by Steven Grant
Preceded by Terry Kavanagh	Iron Man writer 1995–1996 (with Terry Kavanagh)	Succeeded by Terry Kavanagh
Preceded by Cullen Bunn	Aquaman writer 2016–2018	Succeeded by Kelly Sue DeConnick
