= Dan Abnett bibliography =

Publishers
- Marvel Comics: 1988–present
- 2000 AD: 1991–present
- DC Comics: 1997–present
- Warhammer: 1999–present

Dan Abnett has been writing comics and novels since the mid-1980s.

In the comics industry he has worked for some of the biggest UK titles such as 2000 AD and Marvel UK, as well as some of the largest American comic book publishers including Marvel Comics and DC Comics. Abnett has also worked for various other publishers as well, like Dark Horse Comics, the Wildstorm imprint, Boom! Studios and Malibu Comics. He has also co-authored a number of titles, and frequent collaborators include Andy Lanning and Ian Edginton.

He has also written dozens of novels principally in the Warhammer 40,000 universe, as well as Warhammer Fantasy and Torchwood.

== Works ==
=== Comics ===
Comics by Abnett include the following:

==== Marvel Comics ====
- Action Force
- Transformers – "Dry Run" and "Firebug", as well as text stories in the annuals
- Doctor Who (1988–1994):
  - "Echoes of the Mogor" (with John Ridgway, in Doctor Who Magazine #143–144)
  - "Hunger From the Ends of Time" (with John Ridgway, in Doctor Who Magazine #157–158)
  - "Darkness Falling/Distractions/The Mark of Mandragora" (with pencils by Lee Sullivan and inks by Mark Farmer, in Doctor Who Magazine #167–172)
  - "The Grief" (with pencils by Vincent Danks and inks by Adolfo Buylla/Robin Riggs, in Doctor Who Magazine #185–187)
  - "Pureblood" (with Colin Andrew, in Doctor Who Magazine #193–196)
  - "Cuckoo" (with John Ridgway, in Doctor Who Magazine #208–210)
  - "Victims" (with Colin Andrew, in Doctor Who Magazine #212–214)
  - "The Man in the Ion Mask" (with Brian Williamson, in Doctor Who Magazine Winter 1991)
  - "Under Pressure" (with Vincent Danks and Cam Smith, in Doctor Who Magazine Yearbook 1992)
- The Real Ghostbusters (with Anthony Williams, Marvel UK 1988–1992):
  - A Hard Day's Fright (collects The Real Ghostbusters #1–7, 9, 11, 19, 50 and 99, 96 pages, October 2005, Titan Books, ISBN 1-84576-140-5)
  - Who You Gonna Call? (collects The Real Ghostbusters No. 12, 16, 19, 24, 33, 48, 52 and 53, 1989 Annual, 1990 Annual, 1992 Annual, 96 pages, April 2006, Titan Books, ISBN 1-84576-141-3)
  - Which Witch Is Which? (96 pages, July 2006, Titan Books, ISBN 1-84576-142-1)
  - This Ghost Is Toast! (96 pages, November 2006, Titan Books, ISBN 1-84576-143-X)
- William Tell: Graphic Novel (Marvel, 1989, ISBN 1-85400-040-3)
- ThunderCats Annual (Marvel, 1989, ISBN 1-85400-091-8)
- Knights of Pendragon (with co-author John Tomlinson, Marvel UK):
  - Knight of Pendragon (vol. 1) #1–18 (with pencils by Gary Erskine and inks by Andy Lanning, 1990–1991):
    - Volume 1 (collects Knight of Pendragon (vol. 1) #1–9, 216 pages, Panini Comics, October 2009, ISBN 1-84653-431-3)
  - Knight of Pendragon (vol. 2) #1–15 (with pencils by Phil Gascoine and inks by Adolfo Buylla, 1992–1993)
- Death's Head II (with Liam Sharp and Simon Coleby, Marvel UK, 1992)
- Mutatis (with co-author Andy Lanning, and art by John Higgins, 3-issue mini-series, Epic, 1992)
- James Bond Jr. No. 5, 7 and 12 (with Mario Capaldi, Colin Fawcett, Adolfo Buylla, Bambos Georgioli, Marvel, 1992)
- Punisher #64–75 (with co-author Andy Lanning and pencils by Dougie Braithwaite and inks by Al Williamson/Josef Rubinstein, Marvel Comics, 1992–1993)
- Battletide (with co-author Andy Lanning and art by Geoff Senior):
  - Battletide (4-issue mini-series, Marvel UK, 1992)
  - Battletide II (4-issue mini-series, Marvel UK, 1993)
- Dinosaurs: A Celebration: (with Nick Vince):
  - 001 (Marvel, 1992, ISBN 0-87135-904-9)
  - 002 (Marvel, 1992, ISBN 0-87135-905-7)
  - 003 (Marvel, 1992, ISBN 0-87135-924-3)
  - 004 (Marvel, 1992, ISBN 0-87135-925-1)
- Overkill (various, 1992–1994)
- Mys-Tech Wars (with Bryan Hitch, 4-issue mini-series, Marvel UK, 1993)
- Dark Guard (with Carlos Pacheco, 4-issue mini-series, Marvel UK, 1993–1994)
- Gun Runner (with co-author Andy Lanning, and art by Terry Clarke and Anthony Williams, 6-issue mini-series, Marvel UK, 1993–1994)
- Scarlet Witch (with co-author Andy Lanning, and art by John Higgins, 4-issue mini-series, Marvel Comics, 1994)
- Nocturne (with pencils by Joe Fonteriz and inks by John Stokes (1–2 and 4), 4-issue mini-series, Marvel Comics, 1994)
- The Punisher: Year One (with co-author Andy Lanning, pencils by Dale Eaglesham and inks by Scott Koblish, 4-issue mini-series, 1994–1995, tpb, 104 pages, July 2009, ISBN 0-7851-3736-X)
- The Adventures of Mighty Max #1-10 (with various artists, Nov 1994 - Aug 1995)
- Force Works (with co-author Andy Lanning, Marvel Comics):
  - Force Works Ashcan Edition (prelude, 1994)
  - Force Works #1–22 (with pencils by Dave Taylor and inks by Rey Garcia, July 1994 – April 1996)
  - Marvel Comics Presents #169–172 (with artists Lawrence Brown (#169) and Rey Garcia (#170)and in No. 171 pencils by Brian Williamson and inks by Michael Worley, December 1994 – January 1995)
- The Crossing (also includes Force Works #16–20):
  - Iron Man #323–325 (with co-author Terry Kavanagh and various artists, Marvel Comics, 1995–1996)
  - War Machine #20–23 (Marvel Comics, 1995–1996)
- Star Trek: Early Voyages #1–17 (with co-author Ian Edginton, and art by Patrick Zircher, Mike Collins and Javier Pulido, Marvel Comics, 1997–1998, tpb, 436 pages, IDW Publishing, May 2009, ISBN 1-60010-496-7)
- Seeker 3000 (with co-author Ian Edginton, pencils by Andrew Currie, and with inks by Hector Collazo and Andy Lanning, Marvel Comics, 4-issue mini-series, 1998)
- Conspiracy (with Igor Kordey, 2-issue mini-series, Marvel Comics, 1998)
- Magik (with co-author Andy Lanning, with art by Liam Sharp, 4-issue mini-series, 2000–2001)
- Bloodstone (with co-author Andy Lanning, and art by Michael Lopez, 4-issue mini-series, Marvel Comics, 2001–2002)
- Iceman (with co-author Andy Lanning, and art by Karl Kerschl, Marvel Comics, 2002 ISBN 0-7851-0889-0)
- Annihilation: Nova (with co-author Andy Lanning, pencils by Kev Walker and inks by Rick Magyar, 4-issue mini-series, Marvel Comics, June–September 2006, collected in Annihilation Volume 1, 256 pages, hardcover, March 2007, ISBN 0-7851-2511-6, softcover, October 2007, ISBN 0-7851-2901-4)
- Nova (with co-author Andy Lanning, Marvel Comics, 2007-ongoing) collected as:
  - Volume 1 (hardcover, 328 pages, January 2009, ISBN 0-7851-3654-1):
    - Annihilation – Conquest (with pencils by Sean Chen and inks by Scott Hanna, collects Nova #1–7, 168 pages, December 2007, ISBN 0-7851-2631-7)
    - Knowhere (with pencils by Wellington Alves (artist) and inks by Wellington Diaz and Nelson Pereira, collects Nova #8–12 and Annual No. 1, 144 pages, August 2008, ISBN 0-7851-2632-5)
  - Secret Invasion (collects Nova #13–18, March 2009, ISBN 0-7851-2662-7)
  - Nova Corps (collects Nova #19–22, and "Nova: Origin of Richard Rider", 144 pages, May 2009, ISBN 0-7851-3188-4)
  - War of Kings (collects Nova #23–29, 144 pages, December 2009, ISBN 0-7851-4066-2)
- Annihilation: Conquest (with co-author Andy Lanning, Marvel Comics) collected as:
  - Volume One (hardcover, 272 pages, January 2008, ISBN 0-7851-2782-8) collects:
    - "Annihilation: Conquest – Prologue" (with Mike Perkins, one-shot, August 2007)
  - Volume Two (hardcover, 344 pages, August 2008, ISBN 0-7851-2716-X) collects:
    - Nova #4–7 (with pencils by Sean Chen and inks by Scott Hanna, 2007)
    - Annihilation: Conquest (with pencils by Tom Raney and inks by Scott Hanna, 6-issue limited series, January 2008 – June 2008)
- Guardians of the Galaxy (with co-author Andy Lanning and art by Paul Pelletier, Marvel Comics, May 2008, ongoing) collected as:
  - Legacy (collects Guardians of the Galaxy #1–6, 152 pages, hardcover, January 2009, ISBN 0-7851-3326-7, softcover, April 2009, ISBN 0-7851-3338-0)
  - War of Kings (collects Guardians of the Galaxy #7–10 and "Marvel Spotlight: War of Kings", 136 pages, ISBN 0-7851-3339-9)
- "War of Kings" (with co-author Andy Lanning, Marvel Comics):
  - Secret Invasion: War of Kings (one-shot, collected in War of Kings: Road To War Of Kings, 176 pages, June 2009, ISBN 0-7851-3967-2)
  - War of Kings (6-issue mini-series, 2009, collected in tpb, 432 pages, hardcover, November 2009, ISBN 0-7851-4293-2)
- Fusion (with co-author Andy Lanning and pencils by Tyler Kirkham, Marvel Comics/Top Cow Productions, May 2009-ongoing)
- "Realm of Kings" (with co-author Andy Lanning):
  - Realm of Kings (with Mahmud Asrar/Leonardo Manco, one-shot, Marvel Comics, January 2010)
  - Realm of Kings: Imperial Guard (with Kev Walker, 5-issue limited series, Marvel Comics, January–May 2010, tpb, 120 pages, June 2010, ISBN 0-7851-4597-4)
  - Realm of Kings: Inhumans (with pencils by Pablo Raimondi and inks by Andrew Hennessy, 5-issue limited series, Marvel Comics, January–May 2010)
- The Thanos Imperative (with Andy Lanning, 6-issue limited series, Marvel Comics, August 2010 – January 2011, hardcover, February 2011, ISBN 0-7851-5183-4)
- X-Men: The Movie Prequel: Rogue (one-shot, Marvel Comics, August 2000)

==== 2000 AD ====
- Judge Anderson: "Exorcise Duty" (with co-author Andy Lanning and art by Anthony Williams, in Judge Dredd Annual 1991)
- Judge Dredd:
  - "Rad Blood" (with Ron Smith, in 2000 AD #895–896, 1994)
  - "Part Exchange" (with John Burns, in 2000 AD No. 903, 1994)
  - "C-H-A-M-P!" (with Anthony Williams, in 2000 AD No. 967, 1995)
- Vector 13:
  - "Case Six: Marion" (with Sean Phillips, in 2000 AD No. 956, 1995)
  - "Case Eight: Echo Location" (with Nigel Dobbyn, in 2000 AD No. 958, 1995)
  - "Case Two: Danse Macabre" (with Kevin Cullen, in 2000 AD #966, 1995)
  - "Case Five: Shadrach" (with Nick Percival, in 2000 AD No. 969, 1995)
  - "Case Six: A Salver in the Heavens" (with John Ridgway, in 2000 AD No. 970, 1995)
  - "Case 459: Sheep's Clothing" (with Lee Sullivan, in 2000AD Winter Special 1995)
  - "Case Nine: Blackout" (with Mike Perkins, in 2000 AD No. 973, 1996)
  - "Case Four: Parts and Labour" (with Mick Austin, in 2000 AD No. 991, 1996)
  - "Case Eight: Worlds at War" (with John Ridgway, in 2000 AD No. 995, 1996)
  - "Case Nine: The Sad Child" (with Paul Marshall, in 2000 AD # 1032, 1997)
  - "Case One: Side Step" (with Chris Weston, in 2000 AD # 1062, 1997)
  - "Case Two: Cryptogram" (with Alex Ronald, in 2000 AD #1063, 1997)
  - "Case Nine: JFKed" (with Allan Bednar as "Neal Brand", in 2000 AD #1070, 1997)
  - "Case One: Houdini" (with Robert McCallum, in 2000 AD #1078, 1998)
  - "Case Three: Shades of Grey" (with Robert McCallum, in 2000 AD #1080, 1998)
  - "Case Six: Godhead Revisited" (with Allan Bednar, in 2000 AD #1083, 1998)
- Strontium Dogs: "High Moon" (with Mark Harrison, 2000 AD #940–947, 1995)
- Sinister Dexter:
  - "Sinister Dexter" (with David Millgate, in 2000 AD Winter Special No. 7, 1995)
  - "Nervous Rex" (with David Millgate, in 2000 AD No. 981, 1996)
  - "Curl Up And Die" (with Anthony Williams, in 2000 AD No. 982, 1996)
  - "Bratwurst Than Death" (with Tom Carney, in 2000 AD No. 983, 1996)
  - "Max Vactor" (with Anthony Williams, in 2000 AD No. 984, 1996)
  - "Death and Taxis" (with Charles Gillespie, in 2000 AD No. 985, 1996)
  - "Finnigan's Minigun" (with Tom Carney, in 2000 AD No. 986, 1996)
  - "The Eleventh Commandment" (with Charles Gillespie, in 2000 AD #988–989, 1996)
  - "Alibi of Broadway" (with Charles Gillespie, in 2000 AD #990–991, 1996) – may
  - "Wish Upon A Czar" (with Simon Davis, in 2000 AD #992–993, 1996)
  - "Family Man" (with Henry Flint, in 2000 AD No. 994, 1996)
  - "Executive Unction" (with Tom Carney and David Millgate, in 2000AD Sci-Fi Special 1996)
  - "Learning Kurv" (with David Millgate, in 2000 AD #1023, 1996)
  - "Gunshark Vacation" (with Simon Davis, in 2000 AD #1024–1031, 1997)
  - "Headcase" (with Marc Wigmore, in 2000 AD #1032, 1997)
  - "Murder 101" (with Simon Davis, in 2000 AD #1051–1061, 1997)
  - "Luck of the Irish" (with Paul Johnson, in 2000 AD #1062, 1997)
  - "Waiting For God Knows" (with Julian Gibson, in 2000 AD #1063, 1997)
  - "60 Seconds" (with Paul Johnson, in 2000 AD #1064, 1997)
  - "Market Forces" (with Marc Wigmore, in 2000 AD #1065, 1997)
  - "The Mating Game" (with Siku, in 2000 AD #1066, 1997)
  - "The Worst Fight We Was Ever In" (with Julian Gibson, in 2000 AD #1067, 1997)
  - "A Brief History of Gunsharks" (with Robert McCallum, in 2000 AD #1068, 1997)
  - "Last Orders" (with Marc Wigmore, in 2000 AD #1069, 1997)
  - "Pedal Power" (with Andrew Currie, in 2000 AD #1070, 1997)
  - "Things to do in Downlode When You're Dead" (with Julian Gibson, in 2000 AD #1071, 1997)
  - "Long to rain over us" (with Paul Johnson, in 2000 AD #1072, 1997)
  - "Roll With It" (with Julian Gibson, in 2000 AD #1073, 1997)
  - "Dead Cert" (with Steve Sampson, in 2000 AD #1074, 1997)
  - "Whack the Dinosaur" (with Siku, in 2000 AD #1075, 1997)
  - "Downlode Blues" (with Alex Ronald, in 2000 AD #1076, 1998)
  - "F.A.Q "(with Clint Langley, in 2000 AD #1076, 1998)
  - "Dressed to Kill" (with Siku, in 2000 AD #1078, 1998)
  - "Taking the Mick" (with Steve Yeowell, in 2000 AD #1079–1082, 1998)
  - "The Merry Weirdo" (with Allan Bednar as "Neal Brand", in 2000 AD #1083, 1998)
  - "London Town" (with Greg Staples, in 2000 AD #1084, 1998)
  - "The Big Stiff" (with Alex Ronald, in 2000 AD #1085, 1998)
  - "Lyrical Bollards" (with Simon Davis, in 2000 AD #1086, 1998)
  - "Hand Maid in Downlode" (with Andrew Currie, in 2000 AD #1087, 1998)
  - "To the Devil a Detour" (with Andy Clarke, in 2000 AD #1088–1089, 1998)
  - "Drop Dead Gorgeous" (with Greg Staples, in 2000 AD #1090–1091, 1998)
  - "Mother Lode and the Red Admiral" (with Calum Alexander Watt, in 2000 AD #1092–1095, 1998)
  - "Word Is" (with Ben Willsher as "Sheer", in 2000 AD # 1096, 1998)
  - "Tan Lines" (with Paul Johnson, in 2000 AD #1097, 1998)
  - "Tax Returns" (with David Millgate, in 2000 AD #1098, 1998)
  - "Bullfighting Days" (with Andy Clarke, in 2000 AD #1099, 1998)
  - "Slay Per View" (with Paul Johnson, in 2000 AD # 1102, 1998)
  - "End of the Line" (with Marc Wigmore (1–3), Julian Gibson (4–5), in 2000 AD # 1103–1107, 1998)
  - "Dead Man Whacking" (with Steve Yeowell, in 2000 AD #1108–1109, 1998)
  - "Death is a Lonely Donegan" (with Paul Johnson, in 2000 AD #1111, 1998)
  - "Anatomy of a Throwdown" (with Greg Staples, in 2000 AD #1112, 1998)
  - "Unofficial Business" (with Steve Sampson, in 2000 AD ##1113–1114, 1998)
  - "Sucker Punch" (with Sean Phillips, in 2000 AD #1115, 1998)
  - "Coptalk" (with Lol, in 2000 AD #1116, 1998)
  - "Smoke and Mirrors" (with David Bircham, in 2000 AD #1117–1122, 1998)
  - "Grey's Allergy" (with Patrick Woodrow, in 2000 AD #1123, 1998)
  - "'Twas the Fight Before Christmas" (with Steve Yeowell, in 2000 AD #1124, 1998)
  - "Automate" (with Paul Marshall, in 2000 AD # 1125, 1998)
  - "Reservations" (with Andy Clarke, in 2000 AD # 1126, 1998)
  - "Eurocrash" (with Simon Davis, in 2000 AD # 1127–1139, 1998)
  - "Exit Wounds" (with Simon Davis, in 2000 AD prog 2000, 1999)
  - "Observations" (with Paul Johnson, in 2000 AD #1181, 2000)
  - "Mission to Mangapore" (with Andy Clarke, in 2000 AD #1189–1197, 2000)
  - "Life Behind Bars" (with Simon Davis, in 2000 AD #1198–1199, 2000)
  - "Feeding Frenzy" (with Simon Davis, in 2000 AD #1200–1202, 2000)
  - "Gun Play" (with Nigel Raynor/Stephen Baskerville, in 2000 AD #1203–1205, 2000)
  - "Shrink Rap" (with Andy Clarke, in 2000 AD #1206–1211, 2000)
  - "Lucky" (with pencils by Patrick Goddard and inks by Lee Townsend, in 2000 AD # 1220, 2000)
  - "Way Out West" (with pencils by Patrick Goddard and inks by Lee Townsend, in 2000 AD # 1221, 2000)
  - "Scene of the Crime (with Steve Roberts, in 2000 AD #1222, 2000)
  - "The Man in the Ion Mask" (with Simon Davis, in 2000 AD # 1223–1226, 2000)
  - "Money Shots" (with Andy Clarke, in 2000 AD # 1227–1228, 2000)
  - "Point Blanc" (with Andy Clarke, in 2000 AD #1231–1233, 2000)
  - "Bullet Time" (with Andy Clarke, in 2000 AD prog 2001, 2000)
  - "Dirty Habits" (with Steve Roberts, in 2000 AD #1234, 2001)
  - "Quality Time" (with Steve Roberts, in 2000 AD #1235, 2001)
  - "Barf Bag" (with Andy Clarke, in 2000 AD #1243–1245, 2000)
  - "Fully Laundromatic" (with Ian Richardson, in 2000 AD #1246–1248, 2000–2001)
  - "I say hello" (with Mark Pingriff, in 2000 AD #1264, 2001)
  - "Fear and Clothing" (with Paul Johnson, in 2000 AD #1265, 2001)
  - "On the Fidel" (with Steve Roberts, in 2000 AD #1266–1267, 2001)
  - "Black and White" (with Frazer Irving, in 2000 AD #1268, 2001)
  - "Night of the Living Dude" (with Cam Smith, in 2000 AD #1269, 2001)
  - "Sumo Chanted Evening" (with pencils by Jon Haward and inks by John Stokes, in 2000 AD #1270, 2001)
  - "Suddenly, Genghis" (with Siku, in 2000 AD #1271, 2001)
  - "Glock Around the Clock" (with Mark Pingriff, in 2000 AD #1272, 2001)
  - "Slay Bells in the Snow" (with Anthony Williams, in 2000 AD prog 2002, 2001)
  - "U R Here" (with Adrian Bamforth, in 2000 AD #1279, 2002)
  - "Narked for Death" (with Adrian Bamforth, in 2000 AD #1281, 2002)
  - "Tart au Citroen" (with Steve Roberts, in 2000 AD #1282, 2002)
  - "Poker Face" (with Ian Richardson, in 2000 AD #1283–84, 2002)
  - "Croak" (with Mark Pingriff, in 2000 AD #1290–92, 2002)
  - "House of Whacks" (with David Bircham, in 2000 AD #1294, 2002)
  - "Animal Firm" (with Cam Smith, in 2000 AD #1296–98, 2002)
  - "Deaky Poobar, we hardly knew ye" (with Steve Parkhouse, in 2000 AD #1307–1310, 2002)
  - "Wising Off" (with Mike Collins, in 2000 AD #1311, 2002)
  - "Low Life" (with Steve Roberts, in 2000 AD #1312, 2002)
  - "The Off-Lode Experience" (with Simon Davis, in 2000 AD #1312, 2002)
  - "Get Shirty" (with Simon Davis, in 2000 AD prog 2003, 2002)
  - "Relode" (with Ben Willsher, in 2000 AD #1322–1325, 2003)
  - "Bouncers" (with Steve Roberts, in Judge Dredd Megazine No. 202, 2003)
  - "Gag Reflex" (with Steve Roberts, in Judge Dredd Megazine No. 204, 2003)
  - "Big Game" (with Cam Smith, in 2000 AD #1343–1344, 2003)
  - "Write from Wrong" (with Steve Yeowell, in 2000 AD #1345–1347, 2003)
  - "Oh Kal Cutter" (with Andy Clarke, in 2000 AD #1348, 2003)
  - "Junk Bond" (with Simon Davis, in 2000 AD #1356–1361, 2003)
  - "Five Go Postal in Downlode" (with Simon Davis, in 2000 AD prog 2004, 2003)
  - "Just Business" (with Andy Clarke, in 2000 AD #1380–1382, 2004)
  - "Job Jobbed" (with Andy Clarke, in 2000 AD #1383–1385, 2004)
  - "Scare Tactics" (with Cam Smith, in 2000 AD #1397–1399, 2004)
  - "Off-Ramp" (with Jack Lawrence, in 2000 AD #1415, 2004)
  - "Dunce Macabre" (with Simon Davis, in 2000 AD prog 2005, 2004)
  - "Latte Animals" (with Mark Pingriff, in 2000 AD #1429–1430, 2005)
  - "Vircade" (with John McCrea, in 2000 AD #1431, 2005)
  - "Life's A Beach" (with Steve Yeowell, in 2000 AD #1433–1435, 2005)
  - "Slow Train to Kal Cutter" (with Simon Davis, in 2000 AD #1443–1449, 2005)
  - "...and Death shall have no dumb minions" (with Simon Davis, in 2000 AD #1459–1468, 2005)
  - "Festive Spirits" (with Simon Davis, in 2000 AD prog 2006, 2005)
  - "A Night Off" (with Steve Roberts, in Judge Dredd Megazine No. 242, 2006)
  - "High Tide" (with Steve Roberts, in Judge Dredd Megazine No. 243, 2006)
  - "Places to go, people to do" (with Anthony Williams, in 2000 AD #1508–1513, 2006)
  - "Pros and Cons" (with Ian Richardson (1–3), Simon Coleby (3) and Anthony Williams (4), in 2000 AD #1514–1517, 2006)
  - "The Last Thing I Do" (with Simon Davis, in 2000 AD #1528–1533, 2007)
  - "The Doctor is in" (with Simon Coleby, in 2000 AD #1535–1538, 2007)
  - "Normal Service" (with Anthony Williams, in 2000 AD #1539, 2007)
  - "Life is an Open Casket " (with Anthony Williams, in 2000 AD #1560–1565, 2007)
  - "Yer Ass From Yer Elbow" (with Anthony Williams, in 2000 AD #1589–1590, 2008)
  - "The Bournemouth Identity" (with Anthony Williams, in 2000 AD #1591–1594, 2008)
  - "The Importance of Fleeing Ernest" (with Anthony Williams, in 2000 AD #1595–1599, 2008)
- Flesh: "Chronocide" (with Steve White and Gary Erskine, in 2000 AD #973–979, 1996)
- Venus Bluegenes: "On the Fragshell" (with Simon Coleby, in 2000 AD #976–979, 1996)
- Black Light (with co-writer Steve White):
  - "Survivor Syndrome" (with John Burns, in 2000 AD #1001–1005, 1996)
  - "Lords of Creation" (with Lee Sullivan, in 2000 AD #1006–1009, 1996)
  - "Pandora's Box" (with Steve Yeowell, in 2000 AD #1010–1013, 1996)
- Durham Red (with Mark Harrison):
  - "Epicedium" (in 2000 AD #1006, 1996)
  - The Scarlet Cantos (in 2000 AD #1078–1089, 1998, tpb, ISBN 1-904265-86-3)
  - "Mask of the Red Death" (in 2000 AD #1111, 1998)
  - The Vermin Stars (in 2000 AD #1250–1261, 2001, tpb, ISBN 1-904265-08-1)
  - "The Empty Suns Book I" (in 2000 AD #1362–1368, 2003)
  - "The Empty Suns Book II" (in 2000 AD #1382–1386, 2004)
- Rogue Trooper: "Rogue Troopers" (with Steve White and Alex Ronald, in 2000 AD #1014–1022, 1996)
- Pulp Sci-Fi:
  - "Grunts" (with Mark Harrison, in 2000 AD #1096, 1998)
  - "Best Possible Taste" (with Steve Sampson, in 2000 AD #1121, 1998)
  - "Chimera Canyon" (with Adam Hoy, in 2000 AD #1127, 1999)
  - "Coy's Big Score" (with Neil Googe, in 2000 AD #1129, 1999)
- Sancho Panzer (with Henry Flint, in 2000 AD #1112–1123, 1998)
- Downlode Tales:
  - "Tough Tushy" (with Sean Phillips, in 2000 AD #1126, 1999)
  - "Syn City" (with Siku, in 2000 AD #1127, 1999)
  - "Lone Shark" (with Trevor Hairsine, in 2000 AD #1144, 1999)
  - "The Ass Kickers" (with Paul Johnson, in 2000 AD #1145–1148, 1999)
  - "Scrubbers" (with Calum Alexander Watt, in 2000 AD #1149, 1999)
  - "The Whack Pack" (with Greg Staples, in 2000 AD #1152–1154, 1999)
  - "City on Fire" (with Chris Weston, in 2000 AD #1155–1160, 1999)
  - "Lock and 'Lode" (with Simon Davis, in 2000 AD #1161–68, 1999)
- Badlands (with Kev Walker, in 2000 AD #1178–1182, 2000)
- Roadkill: "Roadkill Book 1" (with Richard Elson, in 2000 AD #1208–1211, 2000)
- Wardog (with pencils by Patrick Goddard and inks by Dylan Teague, in Judge Dredd Megazine #4.01–4.10, 2001)
- Tharg's Future Shocks:
  - "Earth Works" (with Boo Cook, in 2000 AD #1233, 2001)
  - "Raw Recruit" (with Ian Richardson, in 2000 AD #1266, 2001)
- The Scarlet Apocrypha:
  - "Necrocultura" (with John Burns, in Judge Dredd Megazine #4.12, 2002)
  - "Semblance" (with Steve Yeowell, in Judge Dredd Megazine #4.13, 2002)
  - "The Spirit and the Gaki" (with Frazer Irving, in Judge Dredd Megazine #4.14, 2002)
  - "Children of the Night" (with Enric Romero, in Judge Dredd Megazine #4.15, 2002)
  - "Genegun SD" (with Mark Harrison, in Judge Dredd Megazine #4.16, 2002)
  - "Red Menace" (with Carlos Ezquerra, in Judge Dredd Megazine #4.17, 2002)
  - "In the Flesh" (with Mark Harrison, in Judge Dredd Megazine #4.18, 2002)
- Atavar (with Richard Elson):
  - "Atavar" (in 2000 AD #1281–1288, 2002)
  - "Atavar II" (in 2000 AD #1329–1335, 2003)
  - "Atavar III" (in 2000 AD #1443–1449, 2005)
- The V.C.s:
  - "Peace Day" (with Henry Flint, in 2000 AD #1300–1306, 2002)
  - "Look on the Bright Side" (with Anthony Williams, in 2000 AD #1327, 2002)
  - "Escher's Well" (with Anthony Williams, in 2000 AD prog 2003, 2002)
  - "Shotgun" (with Anthony Williams, in 2000 AD #1328, 2003)
  - "Tickover" (with Anthony Williams, in 2000 AD #1329, 2003)
  - "Bystander" (with Anthony Williams, in 2000 AD #1330–1331, 2003)
  - "Green" (with Anthony Williams, in 2000 AD #1332, 2003)
  - "E & E" (with Anthony Williams, in 2000 AD #1333, 2003)
  - "M.I.A." (with Anthony Williams, in 2000 AD #1334, 2003)
  - "Charon" (with Anthony Williams, in 2000 AD #1335, 2003)
  - "Down" (with Anthony Williams, in 2000 AD prog 2004 #1371–1379, 2003–2004)
  - "Old Soldiers" (with Anthony Williams, in 2000 AD # 1432–1441, 2005)
  - "Mail Call" (with Anthony Williams, in 2000 AD # 1486–1495, 2006)
- Kingdom (with Richard Elson
  - Collected as The Promised Land 144 pages, January 2009, ISBN 1-905437-89-7):
    - "Kingdom" (in 2000 AD, prog 2007 and #1518–1525, 2006–2007)
    - "The Promised Land" (in 2000 AD, prog 2008 and #1567–76, 2007–2008)
  - "Call of the Wild" (in 2000 AD #1650-1661, 2009)
  - "His Master's Voice" (in 2000 AD Prog 2011 and #1715-1725, 2011)
  - "Aux Drift" (in 2000 AD #1900-1909, 2015)
  - "Beast of Eden" (in 2000 AD #1961-1972, 2016)
  - "As it is in Heaven" (in 2000 AD #2011-2022, 2017)
  - "Alpha and Omega" (in 2000 AD #2100–2110, 2018)
- Black Atlantic (with Steve Roberts):
  - "Meet the Jetsams" (in Judge Dredd Megazine #253–266, January–March 2007)
  - "Rig" (in Judge Dredd Megazine #276–278, October–December 2008)
- Insurrection (with Colin MacNeil, in Judge Dredd Megazine #279–284, January–May 2009)
- "Lawless"" (with Phil Winslade in Judge Dredd Megazine, #350-354,361-366,371-376,380-385,389-394,400-409,415-419)
- "Brink"" (with Ian Culbard in 2000 AD, #1978-1992,2023-2040,2100-2118,2150-2169)
- "The Out"" (with Mark Harrison in 2000 AD, #2187-2199,2250-2264)

==== Miscellaneous ====
- Ninjak #7–8, #11–21 (with co-authors Andy Lanning, Mark Moretti and Jorge González, with art by Andrew Currie, Tom Mandrake, Yvel Guichet, John Czop and Mike Manley, Valiant Comics 1994)
- Treasure Hunt (with Alan Baker)
  - in the Creepy Mansion: A Puzzle and Role-Playing Adventure (Salamander Books, 1995, ISBN 0-517-14026-8)
  - in the Lost City (1996, Random House ISBN 0-517-14188-4 Salamander Books ISBN 1-85600-056-7)
- Foxfire (with co-author Ian Edginton, and art by Kevin West, 4-issue mini-series, Malibu Comics, 1996)
- Terminator 2: Cybernetic Dawn (Boxtree, 1996, ISBN 0-7522-0390-8)
- Lords of Misrule (with co-authors John Tomlinson and Steve White and art by Peter Snejbjerg and Gary Erskine, Dark Horse, softcover, 200 pages, 1997, tpb, Dark Horse, 1999, ISBN 1-56971-352-9, Radical Comics, hardcover, 264 pages, June 2009, ISBN 0-9802335-8-5)
- HyperSonic (with co-writer: Steve White; Art: Gary Erskine, for Dark Horse, 1997–1998)
- Planet of the Apes: The Ongoing Saga Volume 2: Blood Lines (with co-author Ian Edginton, pencils by Sanford Greene, Pop Mhan, Paco Medina, Adrian Sibar; and inks by Norman Lee, Pop Mhan, Juan Vlasco, for Dark Horse, 2001–2002, tpb, 80 pages, May 2002, ISBN 1-56971-759-1)
- Star Trek: Voyager: The Collection (with co-writers Andy Lanning and Jeffrey Moy, and art by Drew Struzan, 2002, Titan Books ISBN 1-84023-320-6)
- Wallace and Gromit: Pier Too Far (with Jimmy Hansen, 2005, Titan Books ISBN 1-84023-953-0)
- Osprey Graphic History:
  - Gamble for Victory: Battle of Gettysburg (with Dheeraj Verma, 48 pages, October 2006, ISBN 1-84603-051-X)
  - Ironclads at War: The Monitor Vs the Merrimac (with Ron Wagner, 48 pages, October 2006, ISBN 1-84603-053-6)
  - Deadly Inferno: Battle of the Wilderness (with Dheeraj Verma, 48 pages, June 2007, ISBN 1-84603-052-8)
  - The Tide Turns: D-Day Invasion (with Richard Elson, 48 pages, September 2007, ISBN 1-84603-056-0)
  - Hitler's Last Gamble: Battle of the Bulge (with Ron Wagner, 48 pages, September 2007, ISBN 1-84603-057-9)
- Hypernaturals (with co-author Andy Lanning and art by Brad Walker, Andres Guinaldo and Mark Irwin, 12-issue mini-series, BOOM! Studios, July 2012-June 2013)
- Captain Kronos – Vampire Hunter #1-4 (2017)
- Penguins of Madagascar #1-4 (Ape Entertainment, 2014–2015)
- Vampirella: The Dark Powers (art by Paul Davidson, Jordi Pérez, Lee Ferguson, Jonathan Lau, Alessandro Miracolo, Vincenzo Feredici, for Dynamite Entertainment, 2020-2021)
- Red Sonja: The Superpowers (art by Jonathan Lau, for Dynamite Entertainment, 2021)
- Immortal Red Sonja (art by Alessandro Miracolo, Emiliana Pinna, Luca Colandrea, for Dynamite Entertainment, 2022-2023)

==== DC Comics ====
- Resurrection Man (with co-author Andy Lanning and art by Jackson Guice, DC, 1997–1999)
- Aquaman:
  - Aquaman Annual No. 3 (with Anthony Williams, 1997)
  - Aquaman #47–49 (with Jim Calafiore, 1998)
  - Aquaman 1,000,000 (with Tom Grindberg, DC One Million week 3 – fits between Aquaman No. 49 and 50, 1998)
  - Aquaman vol. 8 #1–42 (2016–2019)
- Batman: "Two Faces" (with co-author Andy Lanning, pencils by Anthony Williams and inks by Tom Palmer, one shot Elseworlds story, DC, 1998)
- Superman:
  - "Prime Time" (with co-author Andy Lanning, and art by Graham Higgins), a 10-page short story in Superman 80-Page Giant No. 1 (Feb. 1999)
  - "The Superman Monster" (with co-author Andy Lanning, and art by Tom Palmer and Anthony Williams, one shot Elseworlds story, DC, 1999)
  - Return to Krypton (with co-author Andy Lanning, and art by Karl Kerschl, DC, 2004 Titan Books, ISBN 1-84023-798-8)
- Superman/Batman:
  - "Darklight" No. 43 (with co-author Andy Lanning, and art by Mike McKone, DC, 2008)
  - "Nanopolis" #57–59 (with co-authors Andy Lanning and Mike Johnson, and art by Whilce Portacio, DC, 2009)
- Superman Confidential: #8–10 (with co-author Andy Lanning, and art by Chris Batista, DC, 2008)
- DC One Million 80-Page Giant (with co-author Andy Lanning, and art by Norm Breyfogle, DC, 1999)
- Body Doubles (with co-author Andy Lanning, and art by Joe Phillips, 4-issue mini-series, 1999–2000)
- Legion Lost (with co-author and inker Andy Lanning, and pencils by Oliver Coipel and Pascal Alike, DC, 2000–2001)
- iCandy (with co-author Andy Lanning, and art by Kalman Andrasofszky, 2003–2004)
- The Legion (with co-author Andy Lanning, and art by Chris Batista, Chip Wallace, Leonard Kirk, Dave Cockrum, Tony Harris, Tom Feister, Paul Rivoche and Eric Wight, DC, 2001–2004, tpb, Foundations, collects #25–30, 176 pages, 2004, ISBN 1-4012-0338-8)
- Action Comics #832: "Old Ghosts" (with co-author Andy Lanning, and art by John Byrne, DC, 2005, collected in Strange Attractors, 2006 Titan Books ISBN 1-84576-249-5, DC, ISBN 1-4012-0917-3)
- The New Deadwardians (2012)
- Time Warp #1: "The Principle" (art by I. N. J. Culbard, 2013)
- Titans #1–36 (2016–2019)

==== Wildstorm ====
- Star Trek: Voyager – Elite Force (with co-author Andy Lanning and art by Jeffrey Moy and W.C. Caran, graphic novel, Wildstorm, 2000, ISBN 3-89748-354-8)
- Jet (with co-author Andy Lanning, and art by Dustin Nguyen, 3-issue mini-series, 2000–2001)
- Majestic (with co-author Andy Lanning):
  - Volume 1: Strange New Visitor (with Karl Kerschl, collects Action Comics No. 811, Adventures of Superman No. 624, Superman No. 201 and Majestic 4-issue mini-series, 2004, DC, 2005, ISBN 1-4012-0483-X)
  - While You Were Out (with Neil Googe, Georges Jeanty and Trevor Scott, collects Majestic #1–7, Wildstorm, 2005, ISBN 1-4012-0850-9)
  - Volume 2 (with Neil Googe, Georges Jeanty and Trevor Scott, collects Majestic #8–12, Wildstorm, 2006, ISBN 1-4012-0989-0)
  - Volume 3: Final Cut (with Neil Googe, Diego Olmos, Kevin West and others, collects Majestic #13–17 and Wildstorm Winter Special, Wildstorm, January 2007, ISBN 1-4012-1211-5, ISBN 978-1-4012-1211-7)
- The Texas Chainsaw Massacre (with co-author Andy Lanning, and art by Wesley Craig, 6-issue mini-series, Wildstorm, November 2006, tpb, Titan Books, 144 pages, October 2007, ISBN 1-84576-638-5)
- The Authority (with co-author Andy Lanning and art by Simon Coleby, 2008 – ongoing) collected as:
  - World's End (136 pages, August 2009, ISBN 1-4012-2362-1)
  - Rule Britannia (192 pages, February 2010, ISBN 1-4012-2667-1)

==== Warhammer ====
- Titan: God-Machine (Black Library, 256 pages, 2004, ISBN 1-84416-123-4) collects:
  - Titan I (with Andy Lanning, Anthony Williams, and Marc Gascoigne, 64 pages, 1999, ISBN 1-84154-109-5)
  - Titan II: Vivaporius (with Andy Lanning, Anthony Williams, and Marc Gascoigne, 96 pages, 2001, ISBN 1-84154-144-3)
  - Titan III (with Anthony Williams, 2003, ISBN 1-84154-242-3)
- Darkblade: Reign of Blood (with Kevin Hopgood, Black Library, 256 pages, 2005, ISBN 1-84416-206-0) includes:
  - Darkblade, Book One: Born of Blood (64 pages, 2000, ISBN 1-84154-124-9)
  - Darkblade, Book Two: World of Blood (96 pages, 2001, ISBN 1-84154-147-8)
  - Darkblade, Book Three: Throne of Blood (96 pages, 2003, ISBN 1-84154-241-5)
- Imperial Gothic (Black Library, 208 pages, 2006, ISBN 1-84416-330-X) collects:
  - Inquisitor Ascendant (with Simon Coleby, 84 pages, 2001, ISBN 1-84154-143-5)
  - Inquisitor Ascendant II (with Simon Coleby, 80 pages, 2002, ISBN 1-84154-238-5)
  - Lone Wolves (with Karl Richardson, 96 pages, hardcover, 2003, ISBN 1-84416-056-4, paperback, 2004, ISBN 1-84416-101-3)
- Warhammer 40,000 (with co-author Ian Edginton, collected as Only War Omnibus, 400 pages, ISBN 1-934506-71-0):
  - Damnation Crusade (with art by Lui Antonio and JM Ringuet, 6-issue mini-series, Boom! Studios, December 2006–2007, trade paperback, 144 pages, July 2007, ISBN 1-4276-0679-X)
  - Blood and Thunder (with art by Daniel Lapham, 4-issue mini-series, Boom! Studios, December 2007, tpb, 128 pages, April 2008, ISBN 1-934506-31-1)
  - Exterminatus (with artist Daniel Lapham, 5-issue mini-series, June 2008-ongoing, tpb, February 2009, ISBN 1-934506-55-9)
- Warhammer (with co-author Ian Edginton, collected as Blood of the Empire Omnibus, 400 pages, February 2009, ISBN 1-934506-72-9):
  - Forge of War (with art by Tommy Castillo, 6-issue mini-series, Boom! Studios, 2007–2008, tpb, 128 pages, April 2008, ISBN 1-934506-36-2)
  - Condemned by Fire (with art by Rahsan Ekedal, 5-issue mini-series, Boom! Studios, 2008, tpb, 128 pages, December 2008, ISBN 1-934506-48-6)

=== Prose ===
==== Warhammer 40,000 ====
- Gaunt's Ghosts
  - The Founding (omnibus, 1008 pages, October 2003, ISBN 1-84416-066-1, 768 pages, May 2006, ISBN 1-84416-369-5) collects:
    - First And Only (1999, ISBN 1-84416-164-1)
    - Ghostmaker (2000, ISBN 0-671-78410-2)
    - Necropolis (2000, ISBN 0-7434-1159-5)
  - The Saint (omnibus, hardcover, October 2004, ISBN 1-84416-125-0, paperback, 1027 pages, August 2007, ISBN 1-84416-479-9) collects:
    - Honour Guard (2001, ISBN 1-84154-151-6)
    - The Guns of Tanith (2002, ISBN 1-84154-232-6)
    - Straight Silver (2002, ISBN 1-84154-262-8)
    - Sabbat Martyr (2003, ISBN 0-7434-4360-8)
  - The Lost: (omnibus, ISBN 1-84416-819-0)
    - Traitor General (2004, ISBN 1-84416-113-7)
    - His Last Command (2005, ISBN 1-84416-238-9)
    - The Armour of Contempt (2006, ISBN 1-84416-400-4)
    - Only In Death (October 2008, ISBN 1-84416-662-7)
  - The Victory, Part 1 (omnibus, 960 pages, November 2018, ISBN 1-78496-815-3) collects:
    - Blood Pact (May 2009, ISBN 1-84416-693-7)
    - Salvation's Reach (October 2011, ISBN 1-84416-821-2)
  - The Victory, Part 2:
    - The Warmaster (Dec 2017, ISBN 1-84970-530-5)
    - The Anarch (Jan 2019, ISBN 1-78496-851-X)
  - Ghost Dossier:
    - The Vincula Insurgency (May 2022, ISBN 1-80026-135-7)
  - Sabbat Worlds Crusade connected volumes:
    - The Sabbat Worlds Crusade (Gaunt's Ghosts background book, 96 pages, 2005, ISBN 1-84416-249-4)
- Eisenhorn
  - Eisenhorn (omnibus, 768 pages, October 2004, ISBN 1-84416-156-0):
    - Xenos (2001, ISBN 1-84154-146-X)
    - Malleus (2001, ISBN 0-7434-1176-5)
    - Hereticus (2002, ISBN 1-84154-236-9)
  - Ravenor: The Omnibus (Eisenhorn trilogy spinoff series, omnibus, 768 pages, August 2009, ISBN 1-84416-736-4)
    - Ravenor (hardcover, 2004, ISBN 1-84416-072-6, paperback, 2005, ISBN 1-84416-073-4)
    - Thorn Wishes Talon (ebook, 2004, ISBN 978-0-85787-256-2)
    - Ravenor Returned (hardcover, 2005, ISBN 1-84416-184-6, paperback, 2006, ISBN 1-84416-185-4)
    - Ravenor Rogue (2007, hardcover, ISBN 1-84416-460-8)
  - Bequin (Eisenhorn/Ravenor spinoff series)
    - Pariah: Ravenor Versus Eisenhorn (October 2012, ISBN 1-84970-202-0)
    - Penitent (March 2021, ISBN 1-78999-851-4)
    - Pandaemonium (forthcoming)
  - The Magos (720 pages, 8 March 2018, ISBN 978-1784967024)
    - Includes The Definitive Casebook of Gregor Eisenhorn, a prequel short story compilation
- The Horus Heresy
  - Horus Rising (2006, ISBN 1-84416-294-X)
  - Legion (2008, ISBN 1-84416-536-1)
  - Prospero Burns (November 2009 ISBN 978-1-84416-776-0)
  - Know No Fear (March 2012 ISBN 978-1-84970-134-1)
  - The Unremembered Empire (September 2013 ISBN 978-1-84970-571-4)
  - Siege of Terra Book 4: Saturnine (July 2020 ISBN 978-1-78999-134-5)
  - Siege of Terra Book 8: The End and the Death, Volume I (February 2023 ISBN 978-1-80026-120-4)
  - Siege of Terra Book 8: The End and the Death, Volume II (November 2023 ISBN 978-1-80026-878-4)
  - Siege of Terra Book 8: The End and the Death, Volume III (January 2024 ISBN 978-1-80407-488-6)
- The Beast Arises
  - I Am Slaughter (hardcover, January 2016, ISBN 1-78496-067-5)
- Other:
  - Tactica Imperialis: A History of the Later Imperial Crusades (Warhammer 40,000 background book, with Andy Hoare, 96 pages, 2007, ISBN 1-84416-423-3)
  - Brothers of the Snake (hardcover, June 2007, ISBN 1-84416-475-6)
  - Hard Choices 'What happened on Algol?' (graphic novel prequel to Ultramarines : A Warhammer 40,000 Movie, 32 pages, 2010)
  - Double Eagle (Gaunt's Ghosts spinoff, hardcover, 2004, ISBN 1-84416-089-0, paperback, 2005, ISBN 1-84416-090-4)
  - Interceptor City (sequel to Double Eagle, hardcover, 2025, ISBN 978-1-80407-686-6)
  - Titanicus (October 2008, 400 pages, ISBN 1-84416-661-9)
  - Hive (May 2026, 400 pages, ISBN 9781836093107)

==== Warhammer Fantasy ====
- Tales of Malus Darkblade series (all with Mike Lee)
  - The Chronicles of Malus Darkblade Volume 1 (768 pages, ISBN 1-84416-658-9) collects
    - The Daemon's Curse (2005, ISBN 1-84416-191-9)
    - Bloodstorm (2005, ISBN 1-84416-192-7)
    - Reaper of Souls (2006, ISBN 1-84416-193-5)
  - The Chronicles of Malus Darkblade Volume 2 (720 pages, ISBN 1-84416-783-6) collects
    - Warpsword (2007, ISBN 1-84416-194-3)
    - Lord of Ruin (September 2007, ISBN 1-84416-195-1)
- Other:
  - Gilead's Blood (Warhammer Fantasy novel, with Nik Vincent, 2000)
  - Hammers of Ulric (Warhammer Fantasy novel, with Nik Vincent and James Wallis, 2001)
  - Riders of the Dead (Warhammer Fantasy novel, 2003)
  - Fell Cargo (Warhammer Fantasy novel, 2006)

==== Doctor Who Universe ====
===== Torchwood =====
- Border Princes (BBC Books, January 2007, ISBN 0-563-48654-6, ISBN 978-0-563-48654-1)

==== Doctor Who ====
- The Story of Martha (framing device) (BBC Books, December 2008, ISBN 1-84607-561-0)
- The Silent Stars Go By (BBC Books, September 2011, ISBN 1-84990-243-7)

==== Primeval ====
- Primeval: Extinction Event (272 pages, Titan Books, January 2009, ISBN 1-84576-693-8)

==== Tomb Raider ====
- Tomb Raider: The Ten Thousand Immortals (with Nik Vincent, DK Publishing, October 2014, ISBN 978-1465415479)

==== League of Legends ====
- "The Lure"

==== Original novels ====
- Triumff: Her Majesty's Hero (352 pages, Angry Robot, October 2009, ISBN 0-00-732769-2, September 2010, ISBN 0-85766-022-5)
- Embedded (352 pages, Angry Robot, March 2011, ISBN 0-00-732770-6, April 2011, ISBN 0-85766-090-X)
- Fiefdom (Kingdom novel, with Nik Vincent, 336 pages, Abaddon Books, August 2014, ISBN 1781082340)
- The Wield trilogy (forthcoming, from Gollancz)

=== Audio plays ===
Audio plays and audiobooks include:

- Doctor Who (Big Finish Productions):
  - The Harvest (June 2004)
  - Nocturne (February 2007)
  - The Forever Trap (October 2008)
  - The Last Voyage (January 2010)
  - Thin Time (August 2020)
- Torchwood: Everyone Says Hello (BBC Audiobooks, February 2008)

=== Video games ===
- Guardians of the Galaxy: The Universal Weapon (2014)
- Alien: Isolation (2014)
- Warhammer 40,000: Darktide (2022)

=== Screenplays ===
Screenplays include:

- Ultramarines: The Movie (CGI, animated film, 2010)
