= Kev Hopgood =

British comic artist (born 1961)

- Born: Kevin Hopgood; 25 August 1961 (age 65)
- Areas: Penciller, Inker
- Notable works: Iron Man

Kev Hopgood (born 25 August 1961) is a British comic artist who has been drawing comic books since 1984. He specialises in artwork for science fiction and fantasy comics.

== Biography ==
Hopgood started his career in British comics getting work at 2000 AD and Marvel UK from the mid-1980s onwards on titles like Tharg's Future Shocks, Spider-Man and Zoids, and Action Force.

At Marvel Comics in the early-1990s, he was the main artist on Iron Man where, with writer Len Kaminski, he created War Machine (James Rhodes had appeared earlier, but the alias "War Machine" and the armour were created by Hopgood/Kaminski). War Machine later received his own eponymous series and appeared in the feature films Iron Man and Iron Man 2.

Hopgood took a break from comics following his Iron Man run, working in computer games for three years. His most notable credit during this time is on the space shooter Blast Radius published by Psygnosis. Hopgood returned to British comics in the mid-late 1990s with a run on the rebooted Harlem Heroes story at 2000 AD and the Warhammer Fantasy series Darkblade for Games Workshop with writer Dan Abnett. He worked again with Abnett on the Warhammer 40,000 comic Exterminatus at Boom! Studios, where he also worked on Defenders of Ultramar with Graham McNeill.

His most recent comics work includes the Roman monster hunter story Legion Zero for Aces Weekly, a Doctor Who story for IDW and The Man from the Ministry written by Gordon Rennie and appearing in the Judge Dredd Megazine. He revisited War Machine recently with a "cutaway" style illustration for the Marvel Fact Files published by Eaglemoss. Hopgood continues to work as a freelance illustrator working primarily for children's and educational publishers.

== Bibliography ==
Comics work includes:

- "Dragon" (script and art, in The Mighty World of Marvel vol. 2 No. 13, Marvel UK, June 1984)
- Tharg's Future Shocks:
  - "Grainger in Paradise" (with Peter Milligan, in 2000 AD No. 426, July 1985, collected in The Best of Tharg's Future Shocks, 160 pages, Rebellion, 2008, ISBN 1-905437-81-1)
  - "Wrong Number " (with G. Bell, in 2000 AD No. 512, March 1987)
  - "Zap!" (with Alex Stewart, in 2000 AD No. 518, April 1987)
  - "Marksman" (with Westley Smith, in 2000 AD No. 729, May 1991)
- Spider-Man and Zoids (Marvel UK):
  - Spider-Man and Zoids(#1–4, 8–10, 15–17, 20, 23–25, 29, 32, March–October 1986)
  - "The Black Zoid" (with Grant Morrison, in #40–49, 1986–1987)
- Action Force No. 2, 10, 13, 17, 19–20, 22 (pencils with writers Simon Furman (#2, 10), Mike Collins (#13, 17) and Ian Rimmer (#19–20, 22), Marvel UK, March–August 1987)
- Doctor Who (pencils, collected in A Cold Day in Hell, 180 pages, Panini Comics, May 2009, ISBN 978-1-84653-410-2):
  - "Redemption" (with writer Simon Furman, and inks by Tim Perkins, in Doctor Who Magazine No. 134, March 1988)
  - "Claws of the Klathi" (with writer Mike Collins, and inks by David Hine, in Doctor Who Magazine #136–138, May–July 1988)
  - "Follow that TARDIS!" (with John Freeman, in Doctor Who Magazine No. 147, April 1989)
- Night Zero (with John Brosnan):
  - "Night Zero" (in 2000 AD #607–616, December 1988 – March 1989)
  - "Beyond Zero" (in 2000 AD #630–634, 645–649 and 665–666, June 1989 – February 1990)
  - "Lost in Zero" (in 2000 AD Annual 1991, September 1990)
  - "Below Zero" (in 2000 AD #732–745, May–August 1991)
- Judge Dredd:
  - "A Night at the Basho" (with John Wagner, in Judge Dredd Mega Special 1989, June 1989)
  - "Headbanger" (with Alan Grant, in 2000AD Annual 1990, October 1989)
  - "Roboblock" (with Simon Furman, in Judge Dredd Yearbook 1992, September 1991)
- Dry Run (with Tise Vahimagi, in 2000 AD #688–699, July–October 1990)
- Harlem Heroes (with Michael Fleisher):
  - "Harlem Heroes" (in 2000 AD No. 705, November 1990)
  - "Cyborg Death Trip" (pencils, with inks by Stewart Johnson (931–932) and Siku (933–939), in 2000 AD #928–939, February–May 1995)
- Knights of Pendragon vol. 1 #7–8 (pencils, with Dan Abnett/Gary Erskine, Marvel UK, January–February 1991)
- Strange Cases: "Demonspawn" (with Dave Stone, in Judge Dredd Yearbook 1992, September 1991)
- Iron Man #280–288, 290–297, 299–306 (pencils, with Len Kaminski, Marvel Comics, May 1992 – July 1994)
- Darkblade: Reign of Blood (with Dan Abnett, Black Library, 256 pages, 2005, ISBN 1-84416-206-0) includes:
  - Darkblade, Book One: Born of Blood (in Warhammer Monthly #5–6, July–September 1998, 64 pages, 2000, ISBN 1-84154-124-9)
  - Darkblade, Book Two: World of Blood (in Warhammer Monthly #15–19, 20, May–September 1999, 96 pages, 2001, ISBN 1-84154-147-8)
  - Darkblade, Book Three: Throne of Blood (96 pages, 2003, ISBN 1-84154-241-5)
- "War With Monster Isle" (with Al Ewing, in Marvel Heroes No. 2, Panini Comics, 2008)
- Warhammer 40,000:
  - Exterminatus #1–2 (with writers Dan Abnett/Ian Edginton and co-artist Daniel Lapham, five-issue mini-series, Boom! Studios, June–August 2008)
  - Defenders of Ultramar (with Graham McNeill, four-issue mini-series, Boom Studios, November 2008 – February 2009)
- Legion Zero (with Ferg Handley, in Aces Weekly, October 2012)
- Doctor Who: Prisoners of Time 7 (with Scott & David Tipton, IDW ', July 2013)

=== Covers ===
- 2000 AD ##610, 616, 631, 642, 645, 657, 689, 697, 705, 938, 957 (1989–1995)
- Warheads No. 3 (Marvel UK, 1992)
- Iron Man #280–306 (Marvel, 1992–1994)
- War Machine No. 9, 10, 12–13 (Marvel, 1994–1995)

== Notes ==
Preceded by Paul Ryan	Iron Man artist 1992–1994	Succeeded by Tom Morgan
