= Stickleback (character) =

Comic series by Ian Edginton and D'Israeli

- Stickleback himself, on the cover of 2000 AD Prog #1525 (Feb 2007)

Character information
- First appearance: 2000 AD Prog 2007 (December 2006) (2006)
- Created by: Ian Edginton; D'Israeli

Publication information
- Publisher: Rebellion Developments
- Schedule: Weekly
Title(s)
Prog 2007 and #1518-1525
Prog 2008 and #1567-1577
Prog 2009
- Formats: Original material for the series has been published as a strip in the comics anthology(s) 2000 AD.
- Genre: Steampunk
- Publication date: 2006 – present
- Main character(s): Stickleback; Detective Valentine Bey

Creative team
- Writer(s): Ian Edginton
- Artist(s): D'Israeli
- Letterer(s): Ellie De Ville
- Editor(s): Tharg (Matt Smith)

Reprints
- Collected editions
- Stickleback: ISBN 1-905437-74-9

Stickleback is the eponymous title character of a steampunk comic series created by Ian Edginton and D'Israeli appearing in UK comics anthology 2000 AD. Described by his author as a "bad guy", Stickleback is cast initially as a Moriarty-type figure, "The Pope of Crime[, who] secretly presides over the criminal fraternity of a fantastical, grotesque, Gormenghast-style old London town."

The artist has stated that Stickleback takes place in the same universe as Ian Edginton and Steve Yeowell (and Mike Collins)'s The Red Seas.

== Publication history ==
The series currently consists of three serials (and one single-parter), starting with double - ten page - features in the end of year special issues of 2006, 2007 and 2009, and were then serialised in five page instalments. The first two stories were collected into a trade paperback in August 2008.

A festive one-off in the 2008 end of year special, "Twas the Fight Before Christmas", was drawn by new artist I. N. J. Culbard, who has worked with Edginton on two graphic novel adaptations of books for Self Made Hero.

== Characters ==
Although the title character, Stickleback does not appear in the series immediately, instead ceding the limelight to main character Detective Valentine Bey, and his assistant Sgt. Leonard Chipps. When he makes his appearance, Stickleback (whose true name and origin are only hinted at throughout) is accompanied by a "coterie of freakish compatriots."

Bey and Chipps do not return for the second story, which revolves around Lovecraftian goings-on at Buffalo Bill Cody's Wild West Circus.

The main characters include:

- Stickleback, the eponymous and semi-mythical villain whose exposed spine (which may not be real) gives him his epithet. Stickleback runs a criminal underworld overseen by a gang of outcasts including:
  - Black Bob, a zombie.
  - Little Tonga, a pygmy with a blow-pipe, similar to the character of Tonga from the Sherlock Holmes novel The Sign of the Four.
  - Mister Peepers and Mister Lug, siamese twins. The former has complex binocular spectacles and the latter has large ears .
  - Gay John, a dapper drug baron.
  - Miss Scarlet, a tattooed Madam.
  - Fiery Jack, a burning man reminiscent of a Victorian-era Human Torch.
- Detective Valentine Bey, "The Dark Detective" on the trail of the enigmatic Pope of Crime.
- Sergeant Leonard Chipps, Bey's assistant.
- Chief Constable Delius Lime, their superior, and City Father.
- Alexander Ashenden, representing a particular Agency of the Government.

== Plot ==
Throughout the Stickleback episodes, artist D'Israeli includes nods both overt and sly to a variety of steampunk, Victoriana and other characters and objects. These are noted by the artist on his Blog, and include Gog and Magog, various Cthulhu/H. P. Lovecraft characters and tropes; Nigel Kneale's Kinvig; Doctor Who (in particular the serial "The Dæmons" (1971) and British television series such as Only Fools and Horses, Steptoe and Son and Dixon of Dock Green.

=== Mother London ===
The story opens at some point in the mythical past. Gog and Magog (the defenders of London) are getting old and so they agree to letting a druid sacrifice them so that they can defend the capital forever.

The story moves forward to a Victorian era London where Abdul Alhazred is conducting a séance. However, it appears to be more hypnotism than Spiritualism and the medium is trying to extract information from his clients. Luckily the guest are undercover police officers but an attempt to arrest the villains reveals them to be clockwork automata. They were all created by Prof. Philo Thynne who left his position at London University's Mechanical Engineering Department to run the scheme, not for his personal gain, but to build a device to protect him from Stickleback, with whom he had previously had some kind of contact.

In a series of events a clockwork cow explodes and derails a train with a mysterious cargo, Chief Constable Lime pulls Bey off the case and the latter is kidnapped by a couple of witch doctors. Bey is delivered to Stickleback who reveals that, although his criminal organisation has yet to be targeted, there is a mysterious well-connected group, called the City Fathers, had started taking out various criminal gangs with the intention of taking over London. Stickleback claims that Chief Constable Lime is one of them and that he needs Bey's help and so sets him free, with all the evidence collected by the gang.

=== England's Glory ===
The second tale opens on the supernatural murder of an unnamed individual by Chinese hopping vampires, overseen by a mysterious American. Elsewhere, in the wake of "Mother London," Stickleback's gang are coming under increasing criminal pressure.

An underworld meeting between Stickleback's key 'staff' (including one Mr Tickle, who oversees Black Bob and Tonga) is interrupted by Her Majesty's Agent Alexander Ashenden who extends Stickleback an amnesty in exchange for services rendered. Stickleback makes his own deal. Stickleback's investigations point to 'Buffalo Bill Cody' and his Wild West Circus (including Annie Oakley and Egg Shen) being involved in Lovecraftian doings. Advice from Orlando Doyle (one of several explicit links placing Stickleback in the same "Edginton-verse" as the author's Red Seas) leads to a showdown between the Circus folk and Stickleback's freaks.

Flashbacks and questions bring the mystery of Stickleback's origins to the fore, and Limehouse's Empress is asked to offer him help.

== Art style ==
Artist D'Israeli utilised a new style for his work on Stickleback, eschewing the clear line/vector style, and the "black & white & grey" technique he had used on Leviathan. Feeling that the Leviathan technique was "no longer distinctive," and because the artist "felt I'd done all I wanted to with it," he opted for "an untested technique that was radically different from anything I'd done before."

Citing his main influence as Alberto Breccia, and in particular Breccia's and Juan Sasturain's Perramus. Writing in March 2007, D'Israeli stated that

Perversely, my inability to deal with painting sans black ink outlines made me determined to find some way of doing just that. After faffing around with all sorts of things, I realised that the painted collage work of Alberto Breccia might well hold the key.

Anxious not to "completely throw over the sense of place that had existed in my work to date," D'Israeli drew also on the work of "Breccia's one-time assistant José Muñoz," and that of "cartoonist John Glashan (a favourite from childhood)" to maintain the sense of architectural place even when only "built up using the loosest of drawing[s]."

== Publications ==
All stories are written by Ian Edginton and the first four series have been collected into a trade paperback:

- Stickleback: England's Glory (with art by D'Israeli, Rebellion Developments, August 2008, 132 pages, ISBN 1-905437-74-9) collects:
  - "Mother London" (from 2000 AD, Prog 2007 and #1518-1525, 2006–2007)
  - "England's Glory" (from 2000 AD, Prog 2008 and #1567-1577, 2007–2008)
- "'Twas the Fight Before Christmas" (with art by Ian Culbard, in 2000 AD Prog 2009, 2008)
- Number of the Beast (with art by D'Israeli, Rebellion, December 2014 collects:
  - "London's Burning" (from 2000 AD, #1666-1676, 2010)
  - "Number of the Beast" (from 2000 AD, #1824-1835, 2013)
- Uncollected:
  - "The Thru'Penny Opera" (in 2000 AD, #1900-1911)

== See also ==
- List of steampunk works
- The Red Seas by Ian Edginton and Steve Yeowell, set in the same universe as Stickleback.

=== Other similar work ===
Other works by the same team include:

- H.G. Wells' The War of the Worlds
- Leviathan
- Scarlet Traces

Other similar comics are:

- The League of Extraordinary Gentlemen by Alan Moore and Kevin O'Neill
