= Graham McNeill =

Scottish novelist and video game writer (born 1971)

- Occupation: Games Developer
- Known for: Games Books & Novels
- Title: Senior Writer at Riot Games
- Website: Official website

Graham McNeill is a Scottish novelist and video game writer. He is best known for his Warhammer Fantasy and Warhammer 40,000 novels, and his previous role as games designer for Games Workshop.

== Career ==
In 1996 McNeill started work in an architects’ office designing new flats and commercial properties, until he saw an advertisement for a writer in the December 1999 copy of White Dwarf.

In February 2000, McNeill started work for Games Workshop as a staff writer for games development, writing articles for White Dwarf and army-specific books. In May 2000 he started writing for the Warhammer 40,000 team, but continued to write articles for White Dwarf. McNeill has been heavily involved working on codexes, especially Warhammer 40,000 Codex: Tau between late 2000 and June 2001. Other codexes he has been involved with are Warhammer 40,000 Codex: Necrons, Warhammer 40,000 Codex: Chaos Space Marines, Warhammer 40,000 Codex: Imperial Guard, and Warhammer 40,000 Codex: Daemonhunters. McNeill continued to write codexes after moving into games development.

McNeill has written extensively for The Black Library. His works — False Gods (2006), Fulgrim (2007) and Mechanicum (2008), are part of The Black Library's Horus Heresy novel series. Another part to McNeill's story about the Ultramarines, The Killing Ground, was released in May 2008. Early 2009 saw the release of his first novel outside of the Black Library, I, Mengsk (McNeill, 2009), set in Blizzard Entertainment's StarCraft universe. The novel tells the tale of three generations of the Mengsk family - Angus and his revolutionary activities, his son Arcturus and his rise to power (leading up to the events of the first game), and Arcturus' son Valerian as he struggles to embrace his family's legacy (leading up to the events of the second game).

In April 2009, McNeill contributed a story entitled "The Last Church" to the anthology Tales of Heresy. This was one of the first stories in the Black Library imprint in which the Emperor spoke directly and at length.

McNeill's A Thousand Sons, a Horus Heresy novel focusing on the Thousand Sons legion and their fall from the graces of the Emperor by the hand of the Space Wolves, was released in 2011, and entered at number 22 on The New York Times Best Seller List. This novel was written in sync with Dan Abnett's Prospero Burns (2011) which recounts the same narrative from an opposing perspective. Graham worked closely with Abnett on the two novels, ensuring they met at certain points and would not contradict one another.

In 2011, McNeill wrote his first novel for Fantasy Flight Games (known for a wide range of roleplaying games, card games, and board games), Ghouls of the Miskatonic, the first story of the Dark Waters Trilogy, based on the company's H.P. Lovecraft-derived Arkham Horror board game.

In June 2015 McNeill commenced work with Riot Games, the developing studio of the multiplayer online battle arena game League of Legends, after visiting their main office in West Los Angeles in December 2014. As a senior narrative writer, McNeill develops backstories and lore for individual characters of the game and the in-game world. He is known for focusing on the lore of Demacia, a fictional region which lies in the League of Legends universe. Within the League of Legends community he is primarily known by his alias "Dinopawz". In January 2024 McNeill was laid off from Riot Games.

== Personal ==
McNeill plays Warhammer 40,000, in which he plays with both T'au and Necron armies, he started with The Ultramarines, and Warhammer, in which he plays an Empire army.

== Bibliography ==
=== Books ===
- Chambers, Andy (2004). Warhammer 40,000 Codex: Space Marines (4th ed.). Nottingham: Games Workshop. ISBN 1-84154-526-0.
- Chambers, Andy; Haines, Pete; McNeill, Graham (2001). Warhammer 40,000 Codex: Tau. Nottingham: Games Workshop. ISBN 1-84154-098-6.
- Chambers, Andy; Haines, Pete; Hoare, Andy (2003). Warhammer 40,000 Codex: Imperial Guard (4th ed.). Nottingham: Games Workshop. ISBN 1-84154-410-8.
- Chambers, Andy; Haines, Pete; McNeill, Graham; Hoare, Andy (2002). Warhammer 40,000 Codex: Necrons (3rd ed.). Nottingham: Games Workshop. ISBN 1-84154-190-7.
- Games Workshop Design Staff (2002). Warhammer 40,000 Codex: Chaos Space Marines (1st ed.). Nottingham: Games Workshop. ISBN 1-84154-322-5.
- McNeill, Graham; Haines, Pete (2003). Warhammer 40,000 Codex: Daemonhunters. Nottingham: Games Workshop. ISBN 1-84154-361-6.
- McNeill, Graham; Hoare, Andy; Haines, Pete (2003). Warhammer 40,000 Codex: Witchhunters (1st ed.). Nottingham: Games Workshop. ISBN 1-84154-485-X.
- McNeill, Graham (2007). The Imperial Munitorum Manual. Nottingham: Black Library. ISBN 978-1-84416-502-5.

=== Novels ===
Warhammer

- McNeill, Graham (2003). The Ambassador. Nottingham: Black Library. ISBN 1-84416-051-3.
- McNeill, Graham (2004). Ursun's Teeth. Nottingham: Black Library. ISBN 1-84416-076-9.
- McNeill, Graham (2005). Guardians of the Forest. Nottingham: Black Library. ISBN 1-84416-235-4.
- McNeill, Graham (2011). Defenders of Ulthuan. Nottingham: Black Library. ISBN 978-1-84970-157-0.
- McNeill, Graham (2011). Sons of Ellyrion. Nottingham: Black Library. ISBN 978-1-84970-068-9.

The Legend of Sigmar

- McNeill, Graham (2008). Heldenhammer. Nottingham: Black Library. ISBN 978-1-84416-538-4.
- McNeill, Graham (2009). Empire. Nottingham: Black Library. ISBN 978-1-84416-689-3.
- McNeill, Graham (2011). God King. Nottingham: Black Library. ISBN 978-1-84416-898-9.

Warhammer 40,000

- McNeill, Graham (2002). Nightbringer. Nottingham: Black Library. ISBN 1-84416-163-3.
- McNeill, Graham (2003). Storm of Iron. Nottingham: Black Library. ISBN 1-84416-103-X.
- McNeill, Graham (2004a). Warriors of Ultramar. Nottingham: Black Library. ISBN 1-84416-262-1.
- McNeill, Graham (2004b). Dead Sky, Black Sun. Nottingham: Black Library. ISBN 1-84416-148-X.
- McNeill, Graham (2008). The Killing Ground. Nottingham: Black Library. ISBN 978-1-84416-562-9.
- McNeill, Graham (2010a). Iron Warrior. Nottingham: Black Library. ISBN 978-1-84416-859-0.
- McNeill, Graham (2010b). Courage and Honour. Nottingham: Black Library. ISBN 978-1-84416-722-7.
- McNeill, Graham (2011). The Chapter's Due. Nottingham: Black Library. ISBN 978-1-84416-714-2.
- McNeill, Graham (2012). Priests of Mars. Nottingham: Black Library. ISBN 978-1-84970-176-1.
- McNeill, Graham (2013). Lords of Mars. Nottingham: Black Library. ISBN 978-1-84970-418-2.
- McNeill, Graham (2014). Gods of Mars. Nottingham: Black Library. ISBN 978-1-84970-723-7.
- McNeill, Graham (2019). The Colonel's Monograph. Nottingham: Black Library.
- McNeill, Graham (2021). The Swords of Calth. Nottingham: Black Library.

Horus Heresy

- McNeill, Graham (2006). False Gods. Nottingham: Black Library. ISBN 1-84416-370-9.
- McNeill, Graham (2007). Fulgrim. Nottingham: Black Library. ISBN 978-1-84416-476-9.
- McNeill, Graham (2008). Mechanicum. Nottingham: Black Library. ISBN 978-1-84416-664-0.
- McNeill, Graham (2010). A Thousand Sons. Nottingham: Black Library. ISBN 978-1-84416-808-8.
- McNeill, Graham (2010). The Outcast Dead. Nottingham: Black Library. ISBN 978-1-84970-087-0.
- McNeill, Graham (2012). Angel Exterminatus. Nottingham: Black Library. ISBN 978-1-84970-358-1.
- McNeill, Graham (2014). Vengeful Spirit. Nottingham: Black Library. ISBN 9781849705950.
- McNeill, Graham (2017). The Crimson King. Nottingham: Black Library.
- McNeill, Graham (2020). Sons of the Selenar. Nottingham: Black Library. (novella)
- McNeill, Graham (2020). Fury of Magnus. Nottingham: Black Library. (novella)

StarCraft

- McNeill, Graham (2009). I, Mengsk. New York City: Pocket Books.

Other

- McNeill, Graham (2011). The Dark Waters Trilogy I - Ghouls of the Miskatonic. Roseville: Fantasy Flight. ISBN 978-1-58994-965-2.
- McNeill, Graham (2012). The Dark Waters Trilogy II - Bones of the Yopasi. Roseville: Fantasy Flight.
- McNeill, Graham (2014). The Dark Waters Trilogy III - Dweller in the Deep. Roseville: Fantasy Flight.

=== Comics ===
- Warhammer 40,000 (Boom! Studios):
  - "Fire and Honour" (with Tony Parker, August 2008)
  - "Defenders of Ultramar" (with Kevin Hopgood, November 2008)
- Warhammer Online: Prelude to War (graphic novel given away as part of the Collectors Edition)
