= Warhammer Monthly =

Publication information
- Publisher: Black Library
- Schedule: Monthly
- Format: Ongoing series
- Genre: Military science fiction
- Publication date: March 1998 - December 2004
- No. of issues: 86

Warhammer Monthly was a comics anthology published by Games Workshop's publishing arm, Black Library, from March 1998 to December 2004, running to 86 issues in total. The final two issues were published bi-monthly under the name Warhammer Comic. It featured stories set within the fictional universe of Games Workshop's miniature wargames Warhammer and Warhammer 40,000, amongst others.

== Format ==
The comic used an anthology format, usually featuring three or four stories each of seven to eight pages in length. The stories in Warhammer Monthly were usually serialised, and would run for several months. The most popular stories returned for more series, and were often collected in trade paperback form.

The December 2002 issue of the comic book was called Warhammer Warped Visions. It featured one-shot variations of Black Library's most popular comics, but with their settings reversed between the Warhammer and Warhammer 40,000 universes. For example, the Dark Elf Malus Darkblade was portrayed as a female Dark Eldar named Maless, while the Titan Imperius Dictatio was shown as an Empire Steam Tank.

== Cancellation ==
Warhammer Monthly was cancelled after issue 86.

In 2006, Games Workshop licensed the comic books rights to Boom! Studios. That publisher's first Warhammer 40,000 release was Damnation Crusade, written by Warhammer Monthly stalwart Dan Abnett.

In 2007, The Black Library started the Warhammer Monthly Archive, a site with free PDF versions of the comics. However the site was closed in 2009.

== Awards ==
Warhammer Monthly was voted the Best New British comic in the 1999 National Comics Awards.

The series was nominated for two Eagle Awards and won one:

- 2000 - nominated for Favourite British Comic
- 2001 - nominated for Favourite British Comic
- 2005 - won Favourite British Comic

== See also ==
- Warhammer 40,000 comics, about the various releases
