= Brass Sun =

- The cover of Brass Sun: The Wheel of Worlds (2014, Rebellion, ISBN 9781781082690). Art by INJ Culbard.

Publication information
- Publisher: 2000 AD
- Format: Ongoing series
- Genre: Science fantasy, Steampunk, Adventure
- Publication date: September 2012

Creative team
- Created by: Ian Edginton; I. N. J. Culbard
- Written by: Ian Edginton
- Artist: I. N. J. Culbard
- Letterer: Ellie De Ville

Collected editions
- Hardcover: ISBN 9781781082690

Brass Sun is a work of steampunk science fantasy. It was created by writer Ian Edginton and artist I. N. J. Culbard and is published in the British comics anthology 2000 AD, where it first appeared in 2012.

== Premise ==
The story takes place in a full-size orrery. Wren, the young protagonist, undertakes a quest to restart the dying brass sun at the centre of a gigantic mechanical solar system containing dozens of worlds and moons, all connected via colossal spars.

== Creation ==
Edginton got the idea for the series while speculating about full-scale versions of orreries. The character of Wren was conceived as a capable female character that young girls can relate to.

The Diamond Age, Floating Worlds and Engine Summer likely reference classic science fiction novels of the same name, by Neal Stephenson, Cecelia Holland and John Crowley, respectively. Motor Head likely references the well-known British rock band Motörhead.

== Publications ==
=== Series ===
- "The Wheel of Worlds" (in 2000AD #1800-1811, 2012, 65 pages)
- "The Diamond Age" (in 2000AD #1850-1861, 2013, 65 pages)
- "Floating Worlds" (in 2000AD #1888-1899, 2014, 65 pages)
- "Motor Head" (in 2000AD #1950-1959, 2015, 55 pages)
- "Engine Summer" (in 2000AD #2061-2072, 2017–2018)

In 2014, the first three storylines were published by Rebellion as a six-issue limited series from May to October.

=== Cover art ===
- #1806 "World Building" by Nick Percival
- #1852 "Crawling the Walls" by I. N. J. Culbard
- #1859 "Fly-By Shooting" by I. N. J. Culbard
- #1893 "The Deep End" by I. N. J. Culbard
- #1954 "Kingslayer" by I. N. J. Culbard

=== Collected editions ===
- Brass Sun: The Wheel of Worlds (collects "The Wheel of Worlds", "The Diamond Age" and "Floating Worlds", 2014, Rebellion, ISBN 9781781082690)
