= The Red Seas =

- Cover of Under the Banner of King Death showing Captain Jack Dancer and his crew
- Created by: Ian Edginton; Steve Yeowell

Publication information
- Publisher: Rebellion Developments
- Schedule: Weekly
Title(s)
2000 AD #1313-1321
2000 AD Prog 2004 & #1371-1379
2000 AD #1416-1419
2000 AD #1460-1468
2000 AD #1491-1499
2000 AD #1513-1517
2000 AD #1562-1566
2000 AD #1600-1609
2000 AD Prog 2009 & #1617-1623
- Formats: Original material for the series has been published as a strip in the comics anthology(s) 2000 AD.
- Genre: Swashbuckler
- Publication date: 2002–2013
- Main character(s): Jack Dancer; Isaac Newton

Creative team
- Writer(s): Ian Edginton
- Artist(s): Steve Yeowell
- Letterer(s): Annie Parkhouse; Ellie De Ville
- Editor(s): Tharg (Matt Smith)

Reprints
- Collected editions
- Under the Banner of King Death: ISBN 1-904265-68-5
- Twilight of the Idols: ISBN 1-904265-72-3

The Red Seas is a series appearing in the British comics magazine 2000 AD. It was written by Ian Edginton and drawn by Steve Yeowell.

The stories revolved around Captain Jack Dancer and the crew of his ship, the Red Wench. It mixes pirates with anomalous phenomena, including magic, zombies, the hollow earth, and werewolves.

== Characters ==
=== Crew ===
- Jack Dancer: the Captain of the Red Wench, late of The Royal Navy. Encouraged his crew to rebel against a tyrannical Captain, they elected to follow him into a life of piracy on the high seas, forever on the run from British justice.
- Ginger Tom: Jim's father. A grizzled old sea-dog.
- Bill: A straight-talking, somewhat overweight Scot.
- Jim Salt: Tom's son. A cockney teenager who was killed by Isabella during the events of "The Hollow Earth", leaving Tom heartbroken. The formless entity known as Hnau entered into Jim's corpse, thereby gaining the means to explore the world he had so long ruled over.
- Julius: A young black sailor, illegitimate son of a famous London composer.
- Erebus: An immortal, double-headed dog's head on a robotic chassis, formerly guardian between the realms of the living and the dead, a role in which he seemed to be largely analogous to Cerberus of Greek mythology. The heads of Erebus have been a vital part of the crew, possessed of a wealth of knowledge of the mythic and arcane adversaries which Jack's crew frequently find themselves facing.
- Alexander Dancer: a late addition to the crew, half-brother of Jack.

=== Enemies ===
- Doctor Orlando Doyle was a necromancer who sailed on a ship crewed entirely by the reanimated corpses of drowned sailors. He kidnapped Isabella to try to gain the secret of eternal life, destroying the Red Wench, and killing most of Jack's crew along the way. He was defeated by no less than Satan himself. Doyle also appeared, although in a somewhat different guise, in the second series of Edginton's 2000AD story Stickleback.
- Isabella was a young witch and she was Jack's girlfriend. After enduring several hardships at the hands of Orlando Doyle's zombie crew, she abandoned Jack to 'find herself.' She was next encountered as Queen of the hidden land beneath the Earth, worshipped by the lizard-like race there as She-who-must-be-obeyed, having killed her own father, a shaman, to obtain his power. Now openly hostile to Jack and his crew, she killed Jim and attempted to slay Hnau, the benevolent power who maintained the subterranean world. Hnau sent her to Mars, where before she could suffocate she was slain by Martians bearing an uncanny resemblance to those of The War of the Worlds.
- Professor Karel Toten, late of Leipzig University, is a recurring villain who seems to be nothing more than a spirit form contained in his clothes, his face a blank porcelain mask. He commands power over lost souls, using them to animate men of straw and sacking, and later even metal, his army of 'Hollow Men.'

=== Allies ===
- Mistress Meryl Landlady of the Jolly Cripple, the pub on New Providence Island once frequented by the crew of the Red Wench, and sometimes girlfriend of Billy.
- Hnau was the formless entity who maintained the subterranean world below the Earth's Crust. A hive-mind composed of the last of an exiled race of Martians who fell to Earth in pre-history, it used its powers to preserve and succour a microcosm of the ancient world deep beneath the surface, populated by life that fell through the crack created by the Martian's fall. Now resides in Jim Salt's body.
- Isaac Newton, in the world of The Red Seas, has lived far beyond his natural lifespan, a member of the Brotherhood of the Book.
- Chevalier Augustus - Julius' estranged father, who once helped Isaac Newton thwart a plague of werewolves in London

== Plot ==
"Under the Banner of King Death" saw the crew fighting the zombie pirates of Doctor Orlando Doyle, and culminated in an appearance by Satan himself. It was this first story that saw the destruction of the erstwhile pirate's ship and the deaths of most of the crew. It was also where Erebus joined the team - sent on a spiritual quest by Isabella's shaman father, Jack Dancer travelled to the Spirit World and decapitated Erebus in order to use his immortal heads as a spirit compass to help him locate Isabella, who had been kidnapped by Doyle.

"Twilight of the Idols" saw the crew captured by the Royal Navy, only to be saved from hanging by an elderly Aladdin, who wanted their help in finding the floating island of Laputa.

"Meanwhile..." explored what was happening to the cast of secondary characters while Jack and his crew were away. Erebus and the staff of the Jolly Cripple clashed swords for the first time with Toten. This was also where Erebus gained a new lease of life on his mechanical body; desiring his aid in gathering souls, Toten presented Erebus with the chassis as a bribe - Erebus having up until then been carried about in a glass jar. With Mistress Meryl's help, Erebus double-crossed Toten and kept the chassis.

"Underworld" and "The Hollow Land" saw the crew saved from hanging again, (this time at the hands of the Pirate Council) by Jack's half-brother Alexander. Alexander, together with Isaac Newton, recruited Jack's help on an expedition to find their father, who had gone missing during an expedition to a subterranean world below the Earth's surface. Having located the senior Dancer, they were soon embroiled in a civil war between two tribes of lizard men, and shortly after met with Isabella once more. Both Isabella and Jim died before the return to the surface world, although Jim was resurrected, after a fashion, by the Martian entity Hnau.

"With a bound he was free..." focussed on Isaac Newton's adventures with lycanthropes while the crew were below the Earth's surface.

"War Stories" jumped several hundred years into the future, during the London Blitz of World War II. It featured the reappearance of Toten, as well as Erebus minus a head and Hnau, a shapeshifting entity in Jim's form.

"Old Gods", set two years after 'Hollow Land', saw George Washington recruit Jack's crew to aid him in the American War of Independence.

== Publication ==
These are being reprinted by Rebellion Developments as trade paperbacks:

- The Red Seas:
  - "Under the Banner of King Death" (in 2000 AD #1313-1321, 2002, ISBN 1-904265-68-5, tpb, hardcover, 2005, ISBN 1-904265-68-5, softcover, 2007, ISBN 1-905437-49-8)
  - "Twilight of the Idols" (in 2000 AD Prog 2004 & #1371-1379, 2003–2004, tpb, hardcover, 2005, ISBN 1-904265-72-3)
  - "Meanwhile..." (in 2000 AD #1416-1419, 2004)
- Uncollected:
  - "Underworld" (in 2000 AD #1460-1468, 2005)
  - "The Hollow Land" (in 2000 AD #1491-1499, 2006)
  - "With a Bound he was Free..." (in 2000 AD #1513-1517, 2006)
  - "War Stories" (in 2000 AD #1562-1566, 2007)
  - "Old Gods" (in 2000 AD #1600-1609, 2008)
  - "Signs and Portents" (in 2000 AD Prog 2009 and #1617-1623, 2008–2009)
  - "The Chimes of Midnight" (in 2000 AD #1644-1649, 2009)
  - "Hell and High Water" (in 2000 AD #1688-1699, 2010)
  - "Gods and Monsters" (in 2000 AD #1728-1739, 2011)
  - "Beautiful Freak" (in 2000 AD #1792-1796, 2012)
  - "Fire Across the Deep" (in 2000 AD Prog 2013 and #1813-1823, 2012–2013)

== Shared universe ==
By virtue of several shared people, places and concepts, The Red Seas forms part of the same universe as many of other Ian Edginton's stories, both for 2000 AD and other publishers.

Orlando Doyle, villain of the first series of The Red Seas, features predominantly in the second series of Stickleback as a blind seer or scholar, member of the Brotherhood of the Book.

The Brotherhood of the Book, a concept introduced in The Red Seas whereby certain individuals are keepers of the repository of humanity's hidden wisdom, was also returned to in Stickleback, operating out of the same secret base beneath London, the Temple of Mithras, which may act as a hub around which the different dimensions of Edginton's stories revolve.

The Jolly Cripple, the tavern which Jack Dancer's crew frequent, also appeared as a pub in Stickleback.

The spider-like Martians which appear at the end of "The Hollow Land" may be a deliberate nod to Edginton's H.G. Wells' The War of the Worlds comic adaptation.

== See also ==
- Pirates in popular culture
- Cultural depictions of Isaac Newton
