= Blood and Thunder (comics) =

Comic book series

Warhammer 40,000: Blood and Thunder
- Cover to Blood and Thunder #1 by Wraithdt

Publication information
- Publisher: Boom! Studios
- Schedule: Monthly
- Format: Limited series
- Genre: , military science fiction
- Publication date: December 2007 - March 2008
- No. of issues: 4

Creative team
- Written by: Dan Abnett; Ian Edginton
- Artist: Daniel Lapham
- Letterer: Ed Dukeshire
- Colorist: Aeronik
- Editor: Joe Abraham

Collected editions
- Blood and Thunder: ISBN 1-934506-31-1

Blood and Thunder is a five-issue comic book limited series from Boom! Studios, written by Dan Abnett and Ian Edginton, set in the Warhammer 40,000 Universe.

It follows the Ork Waaagh! of Warboss Gorgutz and his various underlings, trying to avoid his ever raging wrath and kill as much as they possibly can. The story is told from the perspective of Izraell Castillian, an Imperial Guard officer captured and kept as a pet by the Ork Nob Skyva.

== Plot ==
Demaris Tertiary has been assaulted by Waaagh! Gorgutz, and the Ork Nobz Ardnock, Knutta and Skyva are under threat from Gorgutz - whoever is last into the fortress the Ork horde is attacking is to be fed to the Warboss's prized collection of exotic squigs. Colonel Izraell Honor Castillian and his 96th Tallarn Desert Raiders desperately try to fight back the Ork Waaagh! at the garrison of the Senshu factory hive. Izraell's backup is defeated and his own armoured vehicle platoon is captured by the Orks and used against the garrison. The garrison is quickly destroyed, and the colonel falls down in the debris only to survive by falling into a sewage pipe. Ork Nob Skyva finds that he is the last to enter the breached garrison, much to his frustration, but then discovers Izraell and mistakes the sewage-covered human for some kind of exotic squig. Hoping to bargain for his life, Skyva captures Izraell and takes him to Gorgutz, along with Knutta and Ardnock. As they walk, Izraell, reaching through the bars of his cage, picks up a discarded plasma pistol from a pile of garbage and attempts to kill the three Nobz. Skyva, however, survives and Gorgutz believes that Skyva killed Knutta and Ardnock in order to avoid being fed to his squigs. Impressed, Gorgutz spares Skyva and suggests he keep Izraell as a lucky charm.

== Collected editions ==
The series has been collected into a trade paperback:

- Blood and Thunder (4-issue limited series, December 2007-March 2008, tpb, 128 pages, April 2008, ISBN 1-934506-31-1)

== See also ==
- Warhammer 40,000 comics
- Damnation Crusade, a previous Warhammer 40k series, about the Black Templars Space Marines.
- Forge of War, Warhammer Fantasy comic by the same writing team.
