= Triumff =

Triumff: Her Majesty's Hero
- First edition
- Author: Dan Abnett
- Language: English
- Publication date: 2009

Triumff: Her Majesty's Hero is a novel written by Dan Abnett and first published in October 2009 by Angry Robot. The novel unites elements from the fantasy, science-fiction and steampunk genres.

== Setting ==
The novel takes place in a warped version of the present, the Elizabethan Age. Due to the (re-)discovery of the 'Arte of Magick' during the Renaissance, much of the economic and societal workings are pre-industrial in nature, such as the city of London being powered by energy magickally derived from the Cantrips, even though exceptions exist. Politically, Britain and Spain were united through the marriage of Elizabeth I of England and Philip II of Spain, forming the 'Unity', a huge empire comprising all territories under British or Spanish possession at that time. In time, the power seems to have shifted strongly from Spain to England, the Queen and the British Court, with the Unity being ruled by Elizabeth XXX. as a quasi-absolute monarch at the time of the novel (i.e. in 2009/2010). Much of the current world is unknown and Australia has been only recently discovered by Rupert Triumff. The system of exploration is characterized by so-called 'Letters of Passage' granting an explorer the right to claim, explore and pillage unknown and unclaimed territories in the name of the Queen. The Elizabethan society and its reliance on magick are contrasted by the Australian society of Beach, which discarded the use of magick in favor of technology and has achieved a level of development comparable to that of modern-day industrialized countries.

== Plot ==
The plot revolves around Rupert Triumff, explorer and adventurer, who has only recently come back from an expedition to the South Sea, resulting in the discovery of Australia and Beach. Coming back to England, Triumff questions the over-reliance of the Unity on magick and fears that Beach might be destroyed by Unity, thus delaying his report to the Queen. However, while Triumff demures, a circle of conspirators close to the British Court have set their eyes on Australia and want to exploit the new discovery to accrue their power. It is in that circle of conspirations that Triumff becomes increasingly entangled and will see him facing a threat to the monarchy, Unity and maybe the world itself.

== Reception ==
The novel was generally well-received, with Unbound stating it to be "delightful, often original and hugely entertaining read" and Mike Carey describing it as "brilliant occult-comedy-historical adventure".

== Websites ==
- Book description on the publisher's website
