= Leviathan (2000 AD) =

Horror comic series

Publication information
- Publisher: 2000 AD (Rebellion Developments)
- Format: Limited series
- Genre: Horror, steampunk
- Publication date: 2003–2005

Creative team
- Created by: Ian Edginton; D'Israeli
- Written by: Ian Edginton
- Artist(s): D'Israeli

Collected editions
- Leviathan: ISBN 1-904265-65-0

Leviathan is a horror comic series created by Ian Edginton and D'Israeli, which appeared in the British magazine 2000 AD starting in 2003.

The story is set on a mile-long ocean liner (the Leviathan of the title) which has been transported to some sort of parallel world with no land or landmarks. The story appeared in ten parts followed by three stand alone "Tales of the Leviathan" which expanded on the history of the ship as well as featuring new characters.

== Characters ==
- Detective Sergeant Aurelius Lament, a police officer investigating the mystery. His wife, Mary, died in child birth five years earlier, the result of the ship's doctor being drunk.
- William Ashbless, the ship's architect
- Sky Baker, a "Mace", one of the unofficial police who maintain order in Steerage class. Her mother was killed by the Stokers about six months before the story starts.
- Hastur, the demon influencing/powering the ship under control of Ashbless. His servants - known as Stokers - kill their victims by flaying them with their long tongues.
- Davy Moyes a young Scottish apprentice who became Hastur's first servant (in "Chosen Son")
- Captain Michael McLean, Captain of the Leviathan, and previously a soldier, hunter and adventurer who went on an expedition to Hold Thirteen, rumoured to be filled with luxury items. (in "McLean's Last Case").
- Petra Connaught, famed aviatrix killed whilst trying to search for land (in "Beyond the Blue Horizon").

== Plot ==
The Leviathan is the largest ship ever built—a mile long, half a mile tall and taking ten years to build. Designed by architect Ashbless—who is aboard and part of the governing cabal—and launched in 1928 with some 28,000 onboard, her maiden voyage was to New York. At some unspecified point of the journey, it disappeared and has spent the last twenty years lost in an endless and lifeless ocean.

Detective Lament is summoned to the officers' club, where the cabal ask him to look into several murders—hushed up as suicides—that have occurred in the First Class section. Initially Lament is loath to become involved, as he believes the First Class hold everybody in contempt, however Captain McLean persuades him to investigate.

Lament has barely begun his investigation before it is curtailed and ship's security arrest a member of staff who was caught stealing supplies—food being in short order—believing him to be the murderer. The steward insists that "Stokers"—ship-board mythical bogymen are in fact real and responsible for the deaths, but before Lament can question him further security execute him. Disgusted, Lament returns to his deck and regrets his involvement.

Later McLean approaches Lament and again asks for his help, suspecting that the steward was correct and unnatural forces are at work—the engine room has been off limits for 5 years and, despite having lights, heat and power, "the Leviathan should have run out of fuel decades ago". Lament again takes up his investigation and ventures into the Steerage decks, where, after a violent encounter, he is rescued by Sky Baker, a "Mace"—one of the self-appointed security for the Steerage decks.

Sky confirms Lament's theory about the Stokers, and the two venture down to the engine room. Ambushed by a horde of Stokers, they are taken to the "engine" itself—an oubliette containing the Demon Hastur. Hastur explains that Ashbless is in fact eight hundred years old, initially one of the Knights Hospitaller during the Crusades, but entered a devil's bargain: Ashbless owns Hastur's soul, and is immortal so long as he has it. Should Ashbless give up or lose Hastur's soul (represented by a talisman stylised as an eye—a symbol seen throughout the ship), Hastur would be free to exact revenge upon Ashbless' soul. Hastur claims that despite being a demon, he only wishes to be released from Ashbless' control—should Lament help him, in return he will restore Leviathan and all onboard to New York.

Sky distrusts Hastur, but Lament disagrees, and confronts Ashbless who confirms everything Hastur has said. During a struggle, Ashbless is shot several times, but shows that he is indeed immortal with no reaction other than annoyance to his wounds. Ashbless disarms and shoots Lament, but during the struggle, Lament breaks Ashbless' chain containing Hastur's talisman, and Hastur is released from the engine room, taking Ashbless' soul in revenge for hundreds of years of torture.

Hastur keeps his word, and after healing Lament removes Leviathan from the alien world and drops it almost on top of New York, where it crashes into the docks, dwarfing the city outline.

== Collected editions ==
All of the strips were collected in a trade hardcover published by Rebellion Developments in October 2006 (ISBN 1-904265-65-0) then as a softcover in 2010 (190751919X), which got a US edition from Simon & Schuster in 2012 (ISBN 9781907992698):

- Leviathan (in 2000 AD 2003, #1351-1360)
- Tales of the Leviathan:
  - "Chosen Son" (in 2000 AD 2004, #2005 - the 2004 Christmas Special)
  - "McLean's Last Case" (in 2000 AD 2005, #1465)
  - "Beyond the Blue Horizon" (in 2000 AD 2005, #1466)

== See also ==
- Propeller Island by Jules Verne
