= Forge of War =

Warhammer: Forge of War
- Cover to Forge of War #1; Art by Lui Antonio

Publication information
- Publisher: Boom! Studios
- Schedule: Monthly
- Format: Limited series
- Genre: , fantasy, war
- Publication date: May 2007 - January 2008
- No. of issues: 5

Creative team
- Written by: Dan Abnett; Ian Edginton
- Artist(s): Rahsan Ekedal
- Letterer(s): Ed Dukeshire
- Colorist(s): Scott Vanden Bosch; Rob Ruffolo; Deon Nucklos
- Editor(s): Joe Abraham

Collected editions
- Forge of War: ISBN 1-934506-36-2

Forge of War is a five-issue American comic book limited series from Boom! Studios, written by Dan Abnett and Ian Edginton, and set in the low-fantasy world of Warhammer Fantasy.

== Plot ==
The series begins with a battle between the Imperial province of Averland and the forces of Chaos, in which the former is defeated. Over the course of each issue, several fugitives from the retreating Imperial forces gradually meet up, band together, and organize a last-ditch counterattack to hold the Chaos forces at bay.

Sergeant Vogal leads a regiment of elite Greatswords. Despite the presence of Averland's Elector Count himself, the Imperial forces are routed when Chaos magic decimates them, and Vogal is forced to call for a retreat; since Greatswords are sworn to never retreat, this decision haunts him for the rest of the story. When he and his men are cornered by the pursuing Chaos Warriors in a wood, Vogal is suddenly knocked unconscious. He awakens in a convent, with he and his men being treated by the sisters. He is offered some wine to help him sleep, which he refuses. Woken by a nightmare in the middle of the night, he discovers his men have been drugged and that the nuns, who are actually the servants of a Lamiahn vampire queen, have been feeding soldiers to their mistress. He convinces his remaining men not to take their wine that night; they recover their weaponry and kill the vampire and her servants, then leave the convent to find more fugitives.

A regiment of Dwarfs allied to the Averland army is all but wiped out when their leader, Skor Lokkinson, disdains the humans' decision to retreat and orders his troops to keep fighting despite the hopeless odds. Only three survivors are captured by the Chaos forces: Lokkinson, Uthamir Gundasson and Vargni Valhirsson. All three are thrown into a pit with a Chaos ogre, for the amusement of their captors. Lokkinson is killed, Gundasson manages to kill the Ogre and is himself killed by the angry spectators, but his actions allow Vargni to escape. Before escaping, he overhears from his captors that the rout of the Imperial army was planned in advance, but misinterprets this to mean that traitors within the Averland army betrayed them.

Vogal and his remaining men meet up with Widdman, an artilleryman whose company was destroyed, and Konig, an Imperial wizard. Together, they manage to subdue a crazed Imperial Gryphon that was terrorizing a nearby village, and allow Konig to use it as a mount. While they are preparing their counterattack in a narrow pass that can delay the Chaos forces, Vargni attacks them, but Vogal convinces him to hold off. Based on what Vargni overheard from his captors, Konig realizes that the Chaos army's sorcerers cast a spell that sapped the Imperial army's morale. Vargni accepts this explanation and joins the remaining Imperial soldiers as they launch their suicidal counterattack in the pass, hoping only to delay the Chaos army long enough to buy time for the rest of the Empire.

The series ends without showing the outcome of the counterattack, but Vogal and Vargni both reappear in the subsequent series Condemned By Fire, also written by Abnett. Both warriors assist the protagonist, Witch Hunter Magnus Gault, and Vogal relates that their force was rescued at the last minute by a massive Imperial army that arrived and defeated the Chaos host. Vargni also finally apologizes to Vogal for his suspicions, admitting that the initial defeat was not the humans' fault, and that Vogal fought with bravery at all times.

== Collected editions ==
The series has been collected into a trade paperback:

- Forge of War (5-issue mini-series, May 2007-January 2008, tpb, 128 pages, Boom! Studios, April 2008, ISBN 1-934506-36-2)

== See also ==
- Warhammer 40,000 comics
- Damnation Crusade, Warhammer 40k comic by the same writing team
