= Ian Edginton =

British comic book writer

- Edginton in 2026
- Born: 1963 (age 62–63)
- Area: Writer
- Notable works: X-Force; Scarlet Traces; H. G. Wells' The War of the Worlds; Leviathan

Ian Edginton is a British comic book writer, known for his work on such titles as X-Force, Scarlet Traces, H. G. Wells' The War of the Worlds and Leviathan.

== Career ==
Ian Edginton is known for his steampunk/alternate history work (often with the artist D'Israeli) and is the co-creator of Scarlet Traces, a sequel to H. G. Wells' The War of the Worlds, which they later went on to adapt in turn, and The Great Game, a sequel to Scarlet Traces. For 2000 AD he has written Leviathan, Stickleback and, with art by Steve Yeowell, The Red Seas as well as one-off serials such as American Gothic (2005).

Scarlet Traces was an idea he had when first reading The War of the Worlds, its first few instalments appeared on Cool Beans website, before being serialised in the Judge Dredd Megazine. Also, The Red Seas was initially going to be drawn by Phil Winslade and be the final release by Epic, but Winslade was still tied up with Goddess, and when ideas for replacement artists were rejected, Epic was finally wound up. The series re-emerged when Edginton pitched ideas to Matt Smith at the start of his 2000 AD career.

With D'Israeli he has created a number of new series including Stickleback, a tale of a strange villain in an alternate Victorian London, and Gothic, which he describes as "Mary Shelley's Doc Savage". With Simon Davis he worked on a survival horror series, Stone Island, and he has also produced a comic version of the computer game Hellgate: London with Steve Pugh.

With Dan Abnett he has written comics based on Warhammer 40,000 (Damnation Crusade and Blood and Thunder) and Warhammer (Forge of War) for Boom! Studios. The most recent is a Warhammer Fantasy series called Condemned by Fire.

He is currently working on a dinosaurs and cowboys story called Sixgun Logic. As part of Top Cow's Pilot Season he has written an Angelus one-shot. he also contributed to Days Missing at Archaia Studios Press.

Following the "World's End" storyline, Edginton took over the writing of Stormwatch: Post Human Division from issue #13 and also at Wildstorm he created Victorian Undead a series which mixes Sherlock Holmes with zombies. He has also written Aladdin: Legacy of the Lost at Radical Comics.

== Bibliography ==
=== Novels ===
- Zool Rules: the Alien Ninja from the Nth Dimension (Pan Macmillan, 1994 ISBN 0-7522-0952-3)

=== Audio ===
- Shield of the Jotunn, a Doctor Who Full Cast audio story from Big Finish Productions
- 'Torchwood:Army of One', A Torchwood Adventure. Read by Kai Owen from BBC Audio.

=== Comics ===
==== Early British comics ====
- "God's Little Acre" (with D'Israeli, in Revolver #2, 1990)
- Strange Cases: "Magic" (with Sean Phillips, in Judge Dredd Megazine #1.8, 1991)

==== Dark Horse Comics ====
- "Downtown: A Nightmare on Elf Street!" (with Steve Pugh in Dark Horse Presents #48-49, Dark Horse Comics, 1991)
- The Terminator: The Enemy Within (with Vince Giarrano, 4-issue mini-series, Dark Horse Comics, 1991, collected in The Terminator Omnibus: Volume 1, 352 pages, February 2008, ISBN 1-59307-916-8)
- Aliens:
  - Rogue (with Will Simpson, 4-issue mini-series, Dark Horse, 1993, trade paperback, 112 pages, 1995, ISBN 1-56971-023-6, 1997, ISBN 1-56971-267-0, collected in Aliens Omnibus: Volume 3, 376 pages, March 2008, ISBN 1-59307-872-2)
  - "Purge" (with pencils by Phil Hester and inks by Ande Parks, one-shot, Dark Horse, 1997, collected in Aliens Omnibus: Volume 6, 376 pages, February 2009, ISBN 1-59582-214-3)
- Predator:
  - "Rite of Passage" (with pencils by Rick Leonardi and inks by Dan Panosian, in Dark Horse Comics #1-2, collected in "Jungle Tales" one-shot, 1995, collected in Predator Omnibus: Volume 4, 430 pages, August 2007, ISBN 1-59307-732-7)
  - "Xenogenesis" (with pencils by Mel Rubi and inks by Andrew Pepoy, 4-issue mini-series, Dark Horse, 1999, collected in Predator Omnibus: Volume 4, 352 pages, October 2008, ISBN 1-59307-990-7)
- Alien vs. Predator:
  - Aliens vs. Predator Omnibus: Volume 1 (456 pages, May 2007, ISBN 1-59307-735-1) includes:
    - Eternal (with Alex Maleev, 4-issue mini-series, Dark Horse, 1998, tpb, 88 pages, 1999, ISBN 1-56971-409-6)
    - "The Web" (with Derek Thompson, and Brian O'Connell, Dark Horse Presents #146-147, 1999)
  - "Pursuit" (with Mel Rubi, and Rob Hunter, in Annual #1, 1999, collected in Aliens vs. Predator Omninbus: Volume 2, 448 pages, October 2007, ISBN 1-59307-829-3)
- Xena: Warrior Princess (with pencils by Mike Deodato Jr. and inks by Neil Nelson, #9-14, for Dark Horse, 2000)
- "The Max Rebo Band in “A Hot Time in the Cold Town Tonite!”" (with Mark Martin & Rick Neilsen, in Star Wars Tales 6, 2000)
- Planet of the Apes (for Dark Horse):
  - The Human War (with pencils by Paco Medina, Adrian Sibar; and inks by Juan Vlasco, Norman Lee, Christopher Ivy, 72 pages, 2001, ISBN 1-56971-584-X)
  - Volume 1: Old Gods (with pencils by Adrian Sibar, Paco Medina; and inks by Norman Lee, Juan Vlasco, 2001-2002, tpb, 80 pages, February 2002, ISBN 1-56971-668-4)
  - Volume 2: Blood Lines (with co-writer Dan Abnett, with pencils by Sanford Greene, Pop Mhan, Paco Medina, Adrian Sibar; and inks by Norman Lee, Pop Mhan, Juan Vlasco, 2001-2002, tpb, 80 pages, May 2002, ISBN 1-56971-759-1)
- Scarlet Traces (with D'Israeli):
  - Scarlet Traces (in Judge Dredd Megazine #4.16-4.18, 2002, tpb, Dark Horse, 2003, ISBN 1-56971-940-3)
  - The Great Game (4-issue mini-series, 2006, tpb, Dark Horse, 104 pages, April 30, 2007, ISBN 1-59307-717-3)
- Kingdom of the Wicked (with D'Israeli, graphic novel for Dark Horse, 2004, ISBN 1-59307-187-6)
- "Honor Bound" (with Steve Pugh, in Star Wars Tales 22, 2005)
- H. G. Wells' The War of the Worlds (with D'Israeli, Dark Horse e-comic and graphic novel 2006 ISBN 1-59307-474-3)
- Hellgate: London (with Steve Pugh, 3-issue mini-series, Dark Horse, 2006–2007, ongoing, tpb, 104 pages, June 27, 2007, ISBN 1-59307-681-9)

==== Marvel Comics ====
- "Lachryma 2099" (with David G. Klein, in 2099 Unlimited #4, Marvel Comics, 1994)
- Blade: The Vampire Hunter #1-8 (with Doug Wheatley, Marvel Comics, July 1994-February 1995)
- Wolverine: Knight of Terra (with co-author John Ostrander, pencils by Jan Duursema and inks by Rick Magyar, graphic novel, Marvel Comics, 1995)
- "The Fallen Idol" (with Enrique Alcatena, in Conan the Savage #5-6, Marvel Comics, 1995–1996)
- Star Trek: Early Voyages (with co-author Dan Abnett, and art by Patrick Zircher, Mike Collins and Javier Pulido, Marvel Comics, 1997–1998, tpb, 436 pages, IDW Publishing, May 2009, ISBN 1-60010-496-7)
- Seeker 3000 (with co-author Dan Abnett, pencils by Andrew Currie, and with inks by Hector Collazo and Andy Lanning, 4-issue mini-series, Marvel Comics, 1998)
- X-Force #102-115 (with co-author Warren Ellis (#102-110) and art by Whilce Portacio and Lan Medina, Marvel Comics, 2000-2001, Counter-X Volume 1 collects #102-109, 192 pages, July 2008, ISBN 0-7851-3304-6)
- "Weapon of Choice" (with Simon Bisley, in X-Men Unlimited #46, Marvel Comics, 2003)
- Star Trek: The Next Generation/X-Men: Second Contact (with co-author Dan Abnett, Marvel Comics/Paramount Comics, 1998)

==== Other US comics ====
- "Shopping" (with Gary Erskine, in Codename: Firearm #3-5, Malibu Comics, 1995)
- Ultraforce #2, 5-9 (with co-authors Warren Ellis (2, 5-7) and Dan Abnett (8-9); and various artists including Darick Robertson and Gary Erskine (8-9), Malibu Comics, 1995–1996)
- Foxfire (with co-author Dan Abnett, and art by Kevin West, 4-issue mini-series, Malibu Comics, 1996)
- Penthouse Comix:
  - "Young Captain Adventure: Mars Needs Men!!!" (with Steve Pugh, in Penthouse Comix #13, 1996)
  - "Zheena: Deadlier Than The Male" (with John Burns, in Penthouse Comix #26, 1997)
  - "Rolling Thunder: Big Girls Don't Cry" (with Steve Pugh, in Penthouse Comix #31, 1998)
- "First Contact" (with Glyn Dillon, in Penthouse Max #3, 1997)
- Vampirella vs Hemorrhage (with writers co-author Thomas E. Sniegoski and art by Michael Bair, 3-issue mini-series, Harris Comics, 1997)
- "The Willow Warriors" (with Eric Shanower, in Weird War Tales #1, DC Comics, 1997)
- Batman:
  - No Man's Land Volume 2 (with D'Israeli, tpb, 2000, ISBN 1-56389-599-4)
  - Batman/Aliens 2 (with Staz Johnson, DC, 2003, ISBN 1-4012-0081-8)
  - Batman '66 Meets Steed and Mrs Peel #1–6 (September 2016 – February 2017, DC Comics, Boom! Studios)
- The Establishment #1-13 (with Charlie Adlard, WildStorm, 2001-2002)
- Starfleet Corps of Engineers: "Caveat Emptor" (with Mike Collins, e-book, 2002, tpb No Surrender, 2003)
- Sojourn #25-34 (with Greg Land, CrossGen, 2002–04):
  - Sojourn, Volume 5: A Sorcerer's Tale (tpb, collects Sojourn #25-30, Checker Book Publishing Group, March 2007, ISBN 1-933160-44-6)
  - Sojourn, Volume 6: Berserker's Tale (tpb, includes Sojourn #31-34, Checker Book Publishing Group, January 2008, ISBN 1-933160-72-1)
- Scion (CrossGen, 2002-2004)
- Witchblade:
  - #78-79: "Signs and Portents" (with art by Tony Daniel, Top Cow, 2004)
  - #113-114 (with co-author Ron Marz, with pencils by Sami Basri, Top Cow, 2008)
- Richard Matheson's Hell House (with Simon Fraser, IDW, 2004–05, 4 issue mini-series, tpb, 200 pages, October 2008, ISBN 1-60010-263-8)
- Warhammer 40,000 (with co-author Dan Abnett, collected as Only War Omnibus, 400 pages):
  - Damnation Crusade (with art by Lui Antonio and JM Ringuet, 6-issue mini-series, Boom! Studios, December 2006 – 2007, trade paperback, 144 pages, July 2007, ISBN 1-4276-0679-X)
  - Blood and Thunder (with art by Daniel Lapham, 4-issue mini-series, Boom! Studios, December 2007, tpb, 128 pages, April 2008, ISBN 1-934506-31-1)
  - Exterminatus (with artist Daniel Lapham, 5-issue mini-series, June 2008-ongoing, tpb, February 2009, ISBN 1-934506-55-9)
- Warhammer (with co-author Dan Abnett):
  - Forge of War (with art by Tommy Castillo, 6-issue mini-series, Boom! Studios, 2007-2008, tpb, 128 pages, April 2008, ISBN 1-934506-36-2)
  - Condemned by Fire (with art by Rahsan Ekedal, 5-issue mini-series, Boom! Studios, 2008, tpb, 128 pages, December 2008, ISBN 1-934506-48-6)
- Pilot Season: "Angelus" (with Stjepan Šejić, one-shot, Top Cow Productions, December 2007)
- Stormwatch: Post Human Division #13-24 (with pencils by Leandro Fernandez and inks by Francisco Paronzini, ongoing series, WildStorm, October 2008 - January 2010) collected as:
  - Volume 3: World's End (collects Stormwatch: PHD #13-19, 136 pages, DC, October 2009, ISBN 1-4012-2489-X, Titan, November 2009, ISBN 1-84856-478-3)
  - Volume 4: Unnatural Species (collects Stormwatch: PHD #20-24, 128 pages, August 2010, ISBN 1-4012-2852-6)
- Days Missing #3 (with Lee Moder, Archaia Studios Press, 2009, tpb February 2010, ISBN 1-932386-84-X)
- Victorian Undead (with Davide Fabbri, limited series, Wildstorm, January 2010 - ongoing, tpb, 144 pages, October 2010, ISBN 1-4012-2840-2)
- Aladdin: Legacy of the Lost (with artists Patrick Reilly and Stjepan Šejić, Radical Comics, 152 pages, ISBN 1-935417-04-5, forthcoming)
- Oblivion (with Joseph Kosinski and art by Tae Young Choi, Radical Comics, August 2010, 128 pages, ISBN 0-9802335-7-7)
- Killer Instinct (with artist Cam Adams, Dynamite Comics, September 2017 – present)
- Iron Maiden: Legacy of the Beast (limited series, 5 issues, 11 October 2017 -)
- Steed and Mrs Peel: We're Needed #1–3 (July – September 2014, Boom! Studios)

==== 2000 AD ====
- The Red Seas (with Steve Yeowell):
  - "Under the Banner of King Death" (in 2000 AD #1313-1321, 2002, tpb, hardcover, November 2005, ISBN 1-904265-68-5, paperback, November 2007, ISBN 1-905437-49-8)
  - "Twilight of the Idols" (in 2000 AD Prog 2004 & #1371-1379, 2003-2004, tpb, May 2007, ISBN 1-904265-72-3)
  - "Meanwhile..." (in 2000 AD #1416-1419, 2004)
  - "Underworld" (in 2000 AD #1460-1468, 2005)
  - "The Hollow Land" (in 2000 AD #1491-1499, 2006)
  - "With a bound he was free..." (in 2000 AD #1513-1517, 2006)
  - "War Stories" (in 2000 AD #1562-1566, 2007)
  - "Old Gods" (in 2000 AD #1600-1609, 2008)
  - "Signs and Portents" (in 2000 AD Prog 2009 & #1617-1623, 2008–2009)
  - "Hell and High Water" (in 2000AD Prog 1688-1699, 2010)
- The Kleggs: "The Kleggs!" (with Mike Collins, in Judge Dredd Megazine #201, 2003)
- Interceptor (with Steve Pugh, in 2000 AD #1337-1345, 2003)
- Leviathan (with D'Israeli, hardcover, 64 pages, November 2006, ISBN 1-904265-65-0) collects:
  - "Leviathan" (in 2000 AD #1351-1360, 2003)
  - "Chosen Son" (in 2000 AD Prog 2005, 2004)
  - "McLean's Last Case" (in 2000 AD #1465, 2005)
  - "Beyond the Blue Horizon" (in 2000 AD #1466, 2005)
- Judge Dredd:
  - "Inside Job" (with Steve Pugh, in 2000 AD #1363-1364, 2003)
  - "Tempus Fugitive" (with D'Israeli, in 2000 AD #1390, 2004)
  - "Time and Again" (with D'Israeli, in 2000 AD #1475, 2006)
  - "Heist" (with Steve Yeowell, in 2000 AD #1480-1481, 2006)
  - "Time's Squared" (with D'Israeli, in 2000 AD #1551, 2007)
  - "High Spirits" (with Dave Taylor, in 2000 AD #1640-1643, June–July, 2009)
- American Gothic (with Mike Collins, in 2000 AD #1432-1440, 2005)
- Rogue Trooper: "New Model Army" (with Steve Pugh, in 2000 AD #1477-1479, 2006)
- Stone Island (with Simon Davis, tpb, 112 pages, February 2008, ISBN 1-905437-57-9) collects:
  - "Stone Island" (in 2000 AD #1500-1507, 2006)
  - "The Harrowers" (in 2000 AD #1550-1559, 2007)
- Stickleback
  - England's Glory (with D'Israeli, trade paperback, 132 pages, August 2008, ISBN 1-905437-74-9) collects:
    - "Mother London" (in 2000 AD, Prog 2007 and #1518-1525, 2006-2007)
    - "England's Glory" (in 2000 AD, Prog 2008 and #1567-1577, 2007-2008)
  - "Twas the Fight Before Christmas" (with I. N. J. Culbard, prog 2009, 2008)
- Detonator X (with Steve Yeowell, in 2000 AD #1534-1543, 2007)
- Ampney Crucis Investigates (with Simon Davis):
  - "Vile Bodies" (in 2000 AD #1611-1616, 2008)
  - "The End of the Pier Show" (in 2000 AD Prog 2010 and #1666-1671, 2009–2010)
  - "The List of Ten" (in 2000 AD Prog 2011 and #1715-1723, 2010–2011)
  - "The English Assassin" (in 2000 AD #1750–present, 2011)
- Brass Sun (with I. N. J. Culbard):
  - "The Wheel of Worlds" (in 2000AD #1800-1811, 2012)
  - "The Diamond Age" (in 2000AD #1850-1861, 2013)
  - "Floating Worlds" (in 2000AD #1888-1899, 2014)
  - "Motor Head" (in 2000AD #1950-1962, 2015)
- "Helium" (with D'Israeli):
  - "Helium" (in 2000AD #1934-1945, 2015)
  - Scorched Earth (in 2000AD #2351-2363, 2023)
  - Red October (in 2000AD #2476-, 2026)
- Fiends of the Eastern Front
  - 1812 (in 2000AD #2100-2105, 2018)
  - Fiends of the Western Front (in 2000AD #2111-2115, 2018-2019)
  - Constanta (in 2000AD #2201-2211, 2020)
  - 1963 (in 2000AD #2273-2282, 2022)
  - Silent Knight (in 2000AD #2362, 2023)
  - Wilde West (in 2000AD #2413-2423, 2025)

==== Other British comics ====
- Nevermore: "Murder in the Rue Morgue" (adaptation, with art by D'Israeli, graphic novel adaptation, Eye Classics, SelfMadeHero, October 2007, ISBN 978-0-9552856-8-4)
- Torchwood: Rift War! (collected as Rift War, 128 pages, June 2009, Titan Books, ISBN 1-84856-238-1):
  - "Part Four: Dino Crisis" (with S. L. Gallant, in Torchwood Magazine #7, 17 July 2008)
  - "Part Seven: The Man Who Fell to Earth" (with D'Israeli, in Torchwood Magazine #10, 9 October 2008)
  - "Part Eight" (with D'Israeli, in Torchwood Magazine #11, 30 October 2008)
- The Picture of Dorian Gray (adaptation, with art by I. N. J. Culbard, 128 pages, graphic novel, Eye Classics, SelfMadeHero, September 2008, ISBN 978-0-9558169-3-2)
- Sherlock Holmes series (adaptation, with art by I. N. J. Culbard, graphic novel, Crime Classics, SelfMadeHero):
  - The Hound of the Baskervilles (144 pages, May 2009, ISBN 1-906838-00-3)
  - A Study in Scarlet (144 pages, October 2009, ISBN 1-906838-01-1)
  - The Sign of Four (144 pages, May 2010, ISBN 978-1-906838-04-1)
  - The Valley of Fear (144 pages, October 2010, ISBN 978-1-906838-05-8)
- A Princess of Mars (adaptation, with art by I. N. J. Culbard, 144 pages, graphic novel, SelfMadeHero, April 2012, ISBN 978-1-906838-41-6)

== Awards ==
- 1998: Nominated for "Best Short Story" Eisner Award, for "The Willow Warriors" in Weird War Tales #1
- 2007: Nominated for the Eisner Awards for:
  - "Best Limited Series", The Great Game
  - "Best Writer", for his work on The Great Game

== Notes ==
Preceded by John Francis Moore	X-Force (vol. 1) writer 2000–2001	Succeeded by Peter Milligan
