= Damnation Crusade =

Comic Book

Warhammer 40,000: Damnation Crusade
- Cover to Damnnation Crusade No. 1 Art by Lui Antonio

Publication information
- Publisher: Boom! Studios
- Schedule: Monthly
- Format: Limited series
- Genre: Military science fiction
- Publication date: December 2006 – July 2007
- No. of issues: 6

Creative team
- Written by: Dan Abnett; Ian Edginton
- Artist(s): Lui Antonio
- Letterer(s): Ed Dukeshire
- Colorist(s): JM Ringuet
- Editor(s): Mark Powers

Collected editions
- Damnation Crusade: ISBN 1-934506-11-7

Damnation Crusade is a six-issue comic book limited series from Boom! Studios, written by Dan Abnett and Ian Edginton.

Set in the fictional world of Warhammer 40,000, it is a vision of never-ending war. Its storyline follows several different Space Marines of the Black Templars chapter.

== Characters and plot ==
The series follows several characters in each issue. Dates and places are given in the form of crusade names and battlefields.

Sword Brethren Gerhart, part of Marshal Korneliusz's Company, is followed fighting at the battle of Carrion Gulf, during the Third Year of the Torment Crusade, fighting Chaos Space Marines. He is seen earlier fighting Necrons at the Succubae Gates, where his fellow Space Marines fear he has too much pride, a sin to the Black Templar Space Marines. While declaring his own feats of victory, his brothers try to persuade him that they are merely servants of the Emperor, and how that they fight only for His glory. He is called away by Marshal Korneliusz, who subtly warns him of his sinning, at which Gerhart sees how he was wrong to act in the way that he was. Gerhart is then shown going to a chapel, meeting with Chaplain Ecastus to ask forgiveness of his vanity and ego, only for the Chaplain to say that Gerhart has none, and only chases battle to praise the Emperor. Later, Gerhart is part of the assault on Magnum Christi, a minor moon on a back-water planet that had been taken over by the forces of Chaos. The Chaos forces flee, despite having both the troops and the tactical positions to drag out the fight. Gerhart and other fellow Space Marines follow the retreating forces of Chaos, only to find why Chaos had invaded the planet; Two Titans, legendary machines of war, have been found by the forces of Chaos. As his squad mates die one by one in duels with Chaos Astartes and with Brother Skeld's reinforcements en route but delayed, Brother Gerhart makes a final stand.

Brother Tankred is a Dreadnought. who is awakened by Techmarine Arnulf to fight on the Eve of the Kasiroth Offensive. The Kasiroth Offensive is a battle against Tau, where Tankred suffers damage from a Battlesuit, although Tankred makes short work of it soon after. Tankred is next shown awakening before repairs from the previous battle were carried out. As the servitors under Arnulf's command scurry for more chemicals to soothe Tankred back to sleep, Tankred declares he has had enough sleep and wishes to speak to Arnulf of previous battles and times, despite the pain of being repaired. When Tankred next awakes, it has been over two centuries and Arnulf is dead, replaced by Techmarine Piramus, his Adept. Piramus informs Tankred on the situation, that Tankred is tasked with destroying a Daemon Prince of Chaos that has destroyed countless Imperial Forces sent to destroy it.

Recruit Raclaw, on Kilhaven, has been chosen to join the Black Templars after being forced to fight for his life against fellow kinsmen and an alien tiger-creature called a Carnodon. Victorious, he is chosen to be tutored in the ways of war by Brother Brunner. Raclaw is then shown after going through the rigorous surgical process of becoming a Space Marine. His first test is fighting and killing another recruit whose body reacted violently with the surgical process and is no more than a ravening monster. Raclaw goes on to suffocate it with the very broken chains that kept it secured to a wall. Raclaw is then shown having become a Neophyte, about to be led into battle against Orks, and survives the battle, causing many casualties against the Greenskin forces after fighting back to back with Brother Cassius. Shortly after, Raclaw and Brunner are part of the Relief of Helespont, where they fight against the forces of the Eldar. Brunner is killed, ripped in half by a Wraithlord. After the battle, which the Black Templars are victorious, Brother Tove replaces the deceased Brunner as Raclaw's Initiate.

The ending of the six-part story shows Raclaw being elevated to the status of Initiate after six decades of training and taking Brunner's forename, "Gerhart", as his own. As the ending unfolds, it seems that Raclaw was Brother Gerhart when he was a Neophyte, and after taking serious and mortal wounds while fighting a successful last stand in the Battle of Carrion Gulf on Magnum Christi, Brother Gerhart was in turn placed in Dreadnought armour. Meanwhile, the Dreadnought Tankred is shown fighting the unnamed Daemon Prince and, although badly damaged, he manages to slay the monster. Shortly after the battle, he is shown being tended to by Techmarine Piramus when Brother Tove, whose full name is revealed to be "Tove Skeld", enters the room where Tankred is hoisted for repairs. He tells the Techmarine that Tove was once Tankred's Initiate and later his Brother-in-Arms. Now that it is known that Tankred was once Brother Gerhart of the Sword Brethren, and before that he was Neophyte Raclaw. The story ends with a barely conscious Tankred saying "Tankred endures...", alluding to the idea that the whole plot revolves around one individual rather than three different ones, to which Tove replies, "As do we all, Brother – In the Emperor's Name!".

The twist ending of the story is due to its nonlinear storytelling.

== See also ==
- Warhammer 40,000 comics
- Blood and Thunder, the next Warhammer 40k series
- Forge of War, Warhammer Fantasy comic by the same writing team
