= Ian Culbard =

British comic artist, writer and animator

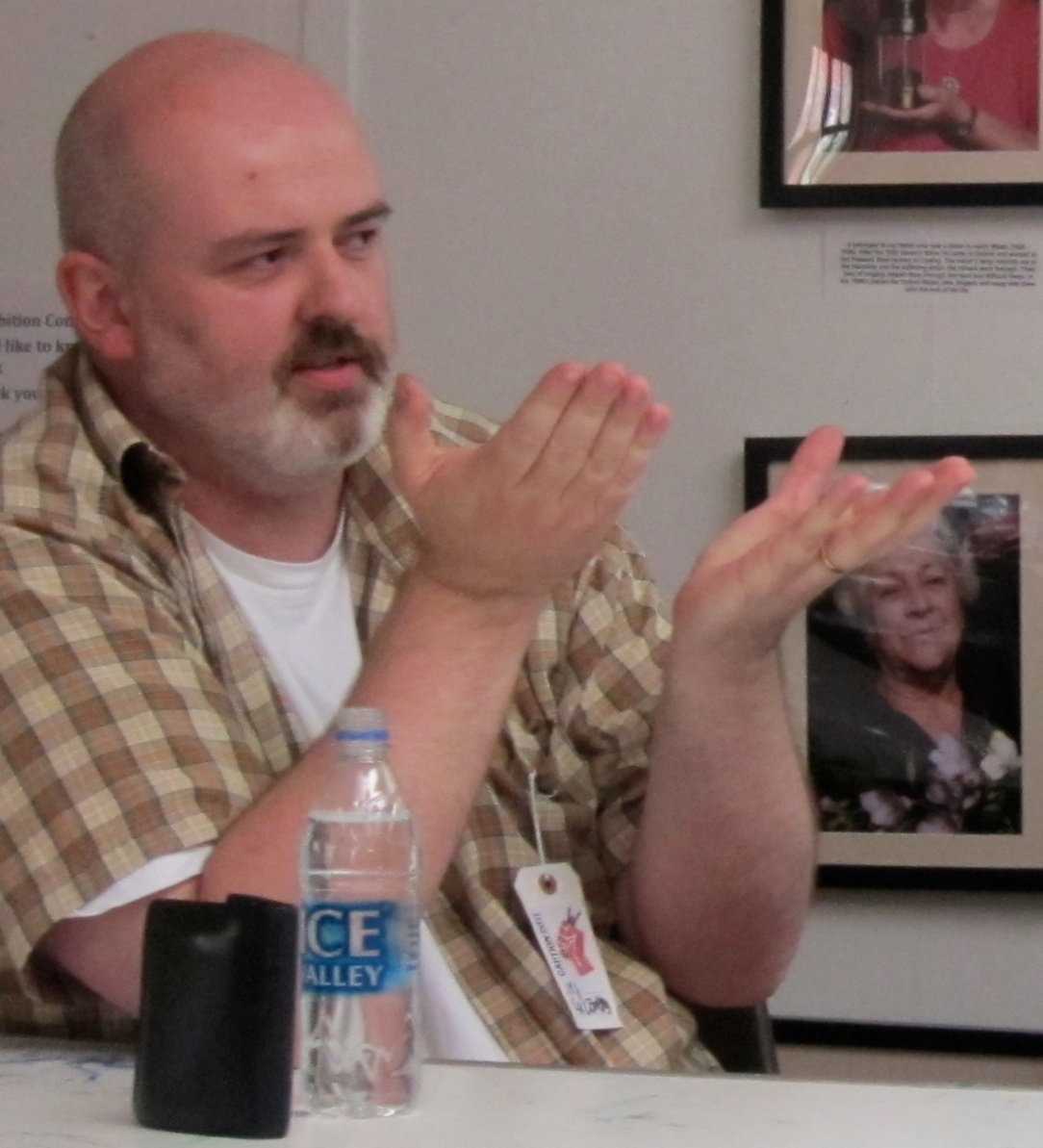
- Ian Culbard photographed in August 2011
- Born: Greenwich, England
- Areas: Writer, Artist

Ian Culbard, professionally known as I. N. J. Culbard, is a British comic artist, writer, and animator.

== Biography ==
Culbard was born in Greenwich, London. He began his career as an animator but is best known for his work in comics and has gained a reputation in particular for his adaptations of classics by H.P. Lovecraft, Robert W. Chambers and Arthur Conan Doyle.

His earliest comic-related work was a contribution to an anthology of competition entries by undiscovered newcomers published as Dark Horse Comics’ New Recruits, followed by some work in the Judge Dredd Megazine and the first of his classics adaptations for SelfMadeHero: The Picture of Dorian Gray in collaboration with Ian Edginton.

Culbard’s first original graphic novel was Celeste, a science fiction story published in 2014 by SelfMadeHero. Other notable original series include those published in 2000 AD: Brass Sun, a steampunk adventure story created in collaboration with Ian Edginton and the science fiction police drama Brink in collaboration with Dan Abnett. Culbard and Abnett have also worked together for Boom! Studios on Wild’s End and for Vertigo on The New Deadwardians.

He won a British Fantasy Award in 2011 for his adaptation of At the Mountains of Madness.

== Influences ==
Culbard has credited French comics creator Jean-Claude Mézières’ science fiction series Valerian and Laureline as well as Katsuhiro Otomo’s manga Domu as influences on his style. He attributes much of his pace and visual economy to the influence of manga.

== Selected bibliography ==
- The Valley of Fear (written by Arthur Conan Doyle, text adapted by Ian Edginton, SelfMadeHero, 2011, ISBN 9781906838058)
- The Case of Charles Dexter Ward: A Graphic Novel (adapted from a story by H.P. Lovecraft, SelfMadeHero, 2012, ISBN 9781906838355)
- Deadbeats (written by Chris Lackey & Chad Fifer, SelfMadeHero, 2012, ISBN 9781906838492)
- The Shadow Out of Time (adapted from a story by H.P. Lovecraft, SelfMadeHero, 2013, ISBN 9781906838683)
- The New Deadwardians (written by Dan Abnett, DC Comics, 2013, ISBN 9781401237639)
- The Dream-Quest of Unknown Kadath (written by H.P. Lovecraft, SelfMadeHero, 2014, ISBN 9781906838850)
- Brass Sun: The Wheel of Worlds (written by Ian Edginton, Rebellion Developments, 2014, ISBN 9781781082690)
- Celeste (SelfMadeHero, 2014, ISBN 9781906838768)
- The King in Yellow (written by Robert W. Chambers, SelfMadeHero, 2015, ISBN 9781906838928)
- Wild's End: The Enemy Within (written by Dan Abnett, BOOM! Studios, 2016, ISBN 9781608868773)
