= Warhammer 40,000 comics =

Comics of the Warhammer 40,000 game

Warhammer 40,000

Publication information
- Publisher: Black Library (1997–2004); Boom! Studios (2006–2009); Titan Comics (2016–2018); Marvel Comics (2020–2022)
- Schedule: Monthly
- Formats: Original material for the series has been published as a set of limited series.
- Publication date: July 1997 – present
- Number of issues: Black Library: 86+ issues Boom! Studios: 23 issues Titan Comics: 21 issues Marvel Comics: 10 issues

Warhammer 40,000 comics are spin-offs and tie-ins based in the Warhammer 40,000 fictional universe. Over the years these have been published by different sources. Originally appearing in Inferno! and Warhammer Monthly (the latter renamed Warhammer Comic when it became a bimonthly publication toward the end of its run), the initial series of stories have been released as trade paperbacks by Black Library, who have also released original graphic novels and shorter prestige format comics (the latter themselves often being collected into a larger trade paperback).

In 2006, Games Workshop licensed Boom! Studios to publish comic books for the franchise, which they started releasing at the end of the year. In 2019, it was announced that Marvel had partnered with Games Workshop to publish Warhammer 40,000 comics.

== History and background ==
=== As part of the game ===
The works produced by the Black Library detail the interactions of the Warhammer 40,000 armies: Chaos Space Marines, Daemonhunters, Dark Eldar, Eldar, Imperial Guard, Necrons, Orks, Space Marines, Tau, Tyranids, and the Witch Hunters. They are collaborated efforts between the authors of the Warhammer 40,000 game rules and the writers of the background.

These works are intended to expand on the storylines, characters, armies, and organizations discussed in the Codexes. (Games Workshop officially uses this non-standard plural of "codex.") Combined with contributions to White Dwarf magazine of articles, stories, and rules, as well as miniature lines produced by both Games Workshop and Forge World, these works are an expansion of the original Warhammer 40,000 game and its other companion games.

=== As part of the fictional universe ===
Most of the graphic novels take place thousands of years after the fall of the Emperor of Mankind at the hands of Horus, his once-loyal son who turned to the worship of Chaos. Many millennia have passed since then, but the Imperium of Man is still at war both with the Chaos armies once led by Horus and with many other new enemies.

These stories are written from the perspective of humans—primarily those of the Imperial Guard, the tech-priests of the Adeptus Mechanicus, the women warriors of the Sisters of Battle, the orders of the Inquisition, and the genetically-enhanced Space Marines. They focus on the Warhammer 40,000 game, with occasional forays into such spin-off games as Necromunda or Inquisitor and use of vehicles and equipment found only in Epic 40,000 (which deals with large-scale miniatures combat rather than the squad-level combat of Warhammer 40,000) or Battlefleet Gothic (which deals with combat between spaceships).

== Publishers ==
=== Black Library ===
==== Bloodquest ====
Bloodquest: Eye of Terror Trilogy, by Gordon Rennie and Colin MacNeil, is a collection of three works titled Bloodquest, Bloodquest: Into the Eye of Terror, and Bloodquest: The Daemon's Mark. The trilogy involves the First Founding Space Marines chapter, the Blood Angels, as they struggle first against the Orks and then against the armies of Chaos.

Plot synopsis

Captain of the Blood Angels, Leonatos, was given a weapon called "Encarmine," the "Sword of Belarius," as a prize for his prowess as a warrior and for the accomplishments of his men on the battlefield. However, Garshul the Destroyer, an Ork, manages to capture the weapon, causing Leonatos to be dishonoured and then exiled. He wanders with his fellow soldiers as they try to regain their honour by hunting down the sword. This takes them into the Eye of Terror where they battle the forces of Chaos that control the planet so they can finally regain their treasured weapon and their honour so they could be welcomed back once again amongst their brethren.

Critical review

Bloodquest was winner of the 2004 Eagle Award for Favourite British Comic while running as a strip for Warhammer Monthly.

Film adaptation

In April 2000, Exile Studios started work on adapting Bloodquest into a CGI film. While initial progress appeared promising, Exile announced on the 10th of March 2003 that "BloodQuest should be considered to be on indefinite hold"; the project was to all intents and purposes cancelled.

==== Daemonifuge ====
Daemonifuge, originally published in Warhammer Monthly, is a series of Trade Paperbacks about the life of Ephrael Stern, a member of the Adepta Sororitas, and is collected as Daemonifuge: Heretic Saint. The main two books of the series are Daemonifuge, by Kev Walker and Jim Campbell, and Daemonifuge: The Lord of Damnation, by Kev Walker, Gordon Rennie, and Karl Richardson.

In addition to the original series, a smaller series was released called Daemonifuge: The Screaming Cage. This series was published in Warhammer Monthly as three part story, and the collection reproduces the original series with additional pages added/edited into the original plot.

Plot synopsis

Heretic Saint publishes the story in chronological order, rather than the order they were published in, in three "books" coming from the three separate volumes.

In Book I: The Screaming Cage, we first meet Ephrael Stern, a Seraphim ranked Sister for the Order of Our Martyred Lady. Mysteriously, she was the sole survivor out of 12,000 that was sent to the planet Parnis in order to battle a daemonic infestation. Inquisitor Silas Hand originally was sent to identify if she was tainted by Chaos and if that was the reason for her survival. While incarcerated, she is attacked by a fellow sister who is possessed by a daemonette of Slaanesh. She defeats them and passes all of the Inquisitor’s tests. Hand was forced to return with her to the planet Parnis in order to figure out her role in the destruction of her Sisters.

During the return, their vessel's navigator was revealed to be a Chaos cultist and destroyed their ship the "Hammer of Thor." Hand, Stern and a troop of her sisters were on a drop ship and escaped the destruction. Shortly after landing upon the planet, they find a lost convent and discover the Screaming Cage. A living sculpture made from the lost nuns. They explain what happened to Stern, how she died and was brought back and escaped. Unfortunately, the daemon Asteroth behind all this arrives and enters into battle with the sisters. He escapes through a warp gate and the others follow to stop Chaos breaking through but they tell Stern to escape.

In Book II: The Lord of Damnation, Stern is rescued by space marines, unaware they have also been infiltrated by Chaos. Luckily, Inquistor Septimus Grinn is working undercover and they escape the ensuing debacle aboard the Inquisition lightship "Golgotha". Returning to Gathalamor she is confronted by the Ordo Malleus who have already tried and convicted her in her absence. She defeats them and falls in with various heretic sects and while she escapes off planet she is captured by pirates and sold on to the Dark Eldar Archons of Commorragh. Eventually, she is rescued by Kyasnil, a pariah Eldar, who leads here into the webway in search of the Black Library. Unfortunately, they get captured by Chaos forces again.

In Book III: The Thrice Born, the Inquisition attack the Chaos ship but Stern kills herself rather than fall into either of their hands. She is buried on Jenicae, a world at war with Nurgle, but when the Inquisition check her tomb her body is gone. She is found out in the jungles fighting Chaos and healing troops. The Inquisition move to neutralise her but her powers have increased again, so they call in a Culexus assassin. Stern uses her newfound powers to escape into the webway, along with the pariah, and they travel once more towards the Black Library.

Critical review

Daemonifuge was nominated for the 1999 Eagle Award for Favourite British Comic while running as a strip for Warhammer Monthly. It won the 2003 National Comic Award for Best Collected Series or Graphic Novel.

Daemonifuge: The Screaming Cage was reviewed by Frank Sronce for RPGnet in 2002. Sronce describes the work as "very nicely illustrated" and "with my very peripheral knowledge of Warhammer 40,000, I had no trouble following the plot".

==== Deathwatch ====
Deathwatch, by Jim Alexander, tells the story of the Ordo Xenos military division, Deathwatch, and their battle against an alien infestation.

Plot synopsis

A group of Deathwatch, commanded by Ultramarine Jerron, is sent to battle against the alien enemies of the Imperium of Man on the planet of Pavia. Unlike other invasions by aliens, this invasion had the ability to appear as humans and infiltrate the Pavian society.

==== Deff Skwadron ====
Deff Skwadron, written by Gordon Rennie, is one of the few comics written from the Ork perspective and so gives an insight into Flyboyz and Smartboyz. Black and white pictures. Elements of dark comedy.

==== Flames of Damnation ====
Published in 2005 and written by various authors, Flames of Damnation is a collection of smaller works that revolve around the actions of the Imperial Guard and the Space Marines against the forces of Chaos, Orks, Eldar, and many other aliens that seek to battle the Imperium of Man.

It collects together two earlier volumes Eternal War and Eternal Damnation.

Critical review

According to Black Library, Comics International reviewed the book and stated: "Gritty sci-fi… with lashings of action and a bit of something for everybody".

==== Inquisitor Ascendant ====
Inquisitor Ascendant, by Dan Abnett, about the Imperial Inquisition's struggle against the forces of Chaos was produced in two parts. His first collaboration was with Simon Coleby, and his second was with Jim Brady.

Plot synopsis

Inquisitor Ascendant follows the story Inquisitor Defay and his apprentice, Gravier on the planet of Nicodemus. They are sent to battle Chaos infestations and are aided by an Ecclesiarchy cardinal named Sarthos. Their investigation and cleansing of the Chaos infestation leads them through many battles and even close experience of the taint first hand. The second part follows a future Gravier, now an Interrogator, and his experience with his previous mentor.

Shortly before the cancellation of the Warhammer Comic, a short strip was published, again by Abnett and Coleby, detailing an Inquisitorial operative infiltrated an Adeptus Mechanicus base to free a servitor built from the body of Gravier. It was intended as a prelude for a third volume of the series which was never written.

==== Kal Jerico ====
Kal Jerico is a Necromunda bounty hunter, created by Gordon Rennie. He has appeared in a couple of comics series, firstly in an eponymous one and then in Contracts and Agendas, both of which are collected in Underhive Bounty Hunter. His story has been continued in a number of novels.

==== Lone Wolves ====
Lone Wolves is a graphic novel by Dan Abnett and Karl Richardson which describes the interactions of Imperial Guard variant and the Space Marines' chapter, the Space Wolves, when fighting the Tyranids. The story is broken into seven parts, "The Miracle," "Eaters of the Slain" Part 1 and 2, "Payback" Part 1 and 2, and "Bloodgeld" Part 1 and 2. Prefaced to the story are short essays produced by editor, Christian Dunn, about the nature of heroes and following the story is the ending original created by Dan Abnett.

Plot synopsis

The Imperial Guard's division titled the "10th Slavok Regiment" are abandoned on the ice-planet Shadrac, which is currently controlled by a Tyranid invasion. Sergeant Poul Marlin narrates the travels of the remaining squads of soldiers as they struggle against hunger, the elements, and the aliens who want to devour them. Joined by the Space Wolves led by Skold Greypelt, the Slavok 10th are able to stand against constant attacks and perform deeds of heroism.

==== Obvious Tactics ====
Obvious Tactics, written and drawn by David Pugh, pitches Blood Angels against Nurgle's Death Guard.

==== The Redeemer ====
The story, written by Pat Mills, follows Klovis the Redeemer on his purge through the Underhive. Klovis, from house of Cawdor, is a Redemption Priest who has to lead his brethren against deviants and mutants. He has taken his crusade out into the Ash Wastes where he discovers a plan to unite the Ratskin, Scavvies and Plague Zombies under The Caller. He is going to combine the power of the Bloodmare and the Rat God to help them sweep through the Underhive and on to destroy Hive Primus. Klovis is the only one who can stop this in time and has to lead his small band of zealots into the Underhive against almost impossible odds.

It was published as a 4-issue mini-series and collected in a single volume. Another collection followed later including an extra eight page story.

==== Titan ====
Titan is a series of works by Dan Abnett that details the history of a Titan and its crew. Titan: God-Machine collects and continues the original three works, Titan I, II, and III. The work describes the actions of the Adeptus Mechanicus and their Titan Legion.

Plot synopsis

The "Imperius Dictatio", a Warlord Class Titan, is a massive war machine used by the forces of the Imperium of Mankind and its Adeptus Mechanicus to battle aliens, heretics, and anyone who stands in the way of conquest. The commander of the Titan dies during a training mission, and before a new commander could be emplaced, the nearby planet Vivaprius comes under attack. Cadet Princeps Ervin Hekate is forced to take command and joins the Imperial Guard defenders against invading aliens, the Tyranids. As they arrive, they discover that the Imperial Guard have been destroyed by the invaders. After battling against this menace, the crew of the "Imperius Dictatio" are sent to the planet Artemis to battle the forces of Chaos, where they must protect the planet against this menace.

Critical review

In 2005, Nathan Brazil, of the Science Fiction and Fantasy website reviewed the Titan: God-Machine series. While praising Dan Abnett as being "one of the better writers of action oriented SF," he claims that the Titan series "allows him so little room for development that he struggles to inject anything that might be described as a more than one dimensional", emphasizing the use of gore and violence in Titan, claiming "just as this sequence is showing promise, it is abruptly cut short with another example of uber violence".

=== Boom! Studios ===
Boom! Studios held the license to produce Warhammer comics and, commencing in 2006, started releasing a number of limited series comic books, which themselves were being collected into trade paperbacks. As of mid-2009, Boom Studios lost the license to Warhammer and Warhammer 40k and will not disclose the reason. They made no explanation or announcement about this to their customers, and just removed all the comics and novels from their website.

==== Damnation Crusade ====
Written by veteran author Dan Abnett in collaboration with Ian Edginton, this story follows seemingly three different members (Scout Raclaw, Brother Gerhart and the Dreadnought, Brother Tankred) of the Black Templars.

==== Blood and Thunder ====
Running from December 2007 to March 2008, Blood and Thunder focuses on the Waaagh!, or war party, of Ork Warboss Gorgutz.

==== Exterminatus ====
5 Issues published, running from June 2008 to November 2008.

=== Titan Comics ===
Titan Comics started publishing Warhammer 40,000 comics in late 2016.

==== Ongoing ====
An ongoing series of Warhammer 40,000 started publishing in October 2016. Will of Iron was the first four-issue story-arc. In addition, a zero issue was published that preceded the story. It was followed by a four-issue storyline titled Revelations and a four-issue arc titled Fallen.

==== Dawn of War III ====
In May 2017, a four-issue limited series titled Warhammer 40,000: Dawn of War III, and linked to an RTS video game of the same name, started publishing.

==== Deathwatch ====
A new four-issue series began in 2018, called Warhammer 40,000: Deathwatch with the first issue released on May 9 and the collected edition in December of that year.

=== Marvel Comics ===
In 2019, it was announced that Marvel had partnered with Games Workshop to publish Warhammer 40,000 comics. Marvel's first Warhammer 40,000 comic was the limited series Marneus Calgar, which was written by Kieron Gillen and illustrated by Jacen Burrows. The second limited series was Sisters of Battle written by Torunn Grønbekk and illustrated by Edgar Salazar.

== Publications ==
Black Library publications include the following. Worth noting is that the volumes come in different sizes. The collections of other volumes, Heretic Saint, Imperial Gothic, Titan: God-Machine, Kal Jerico: Underhive Bounty Hunter, Flames of Damnation and Bloodquest: Eye of Terror Trilogy come in "pocket sized graphic novel" format which is the size of digest (around 20 x 13 cm) while the others are of a larger, comic book size (around 26 x 17 cm).

- Bloodquest: Eye of Terror Trilogy (by Gordon Rennie and Colin MacNeil, Black Library, 256 pages, 2005, ISBN 1-84416-146-3) collects:
  - Bloodquest (104 pages, 1999, ISBN 1-84154-108-7)
  - Bloodquest: Into the Eye of Terror (54 pages, 2001, ISBN 1-84154-126-5)
  - Bloodquest: The Daemon's Mark (96 pages, 2003, ISBN 1-84416-057-2)
- Daemonifuge: Heretic Saint (by Kev Walker, Black Library, 208 pages, 2005, ISBN 978-1-84416-251-2) collects:
  - Daemonifuge (co-writer and artists, with Jim Campbell, 88 pages, paperback, 2000, ISBN 1-84154-117-6, hardcover, 2002, ISBN 1-84154-261-X)
  - Daemonifuge: The Screaming Cage (co-writer and artists, with Jim Campbell, 24 pages, 2002)
  - Daemonifuge: The Lord of Damnation (with Gordon Rennie and Karl Richardson, 88 pages, 2003, ISBN 1-84154-240-7)
- Deathwatch (by Jim Alexander, Black Library, 64 pages, 2004, ISBN 1-84416-100-5)
- Deff Skwadron (by Gordon Rennie and Paul Jeacock, Black Library, 64 pages, 2003, ISBN 1-84416-069-6)
- Flames of Damnation (various creators, edited by Andy Jones and Marc Gascoigne, Black Library, 224 pages, 2005, ISBN 1-84416-253-2)
  - Eternal War (various, 98 pages, 2001, ISBN 1-84154-210-5)
  - Eternal Damnation (various, 96 pages, 2003, ISBN 1-84416-029-7)
- Imperial Gothic (by Dan Abnett, Black Library, 208 pages, 2006, ISBN 1-84416-330-X) collects:
  - Inquisitor Ascendant (with Simon Coleby, 84 pages, 2001, ISBN 1-84154-143-5)
  - Inquisitor Ascendant II (with Simon Coleby, 80 pages, 2002, ISBN 1-84154-238-5)
  - Lone Wolves (with Karl Richardson, 96 pages, hardcover, 2003, ISBN 1-84416-056-4, paperback, 2004, ISBN 1-84416-101-3)
- Kal Jerico: Underhive Bounty Hunter (by Gordon Rennie, Necromunda series, Black Library, 176 pages, 2005, ISBN 1-84416-254-0) collects:
  - Kal Jerico (with Karl Kopinski, 54 pages, 2000, ISBN 1-84154-041-2)
  - Kal Jerico II: Contracts and Agendas (with Wayne Reynolds, 54 pages, 2001, ISBN 1-84154-209-1)
- Obvious Tactics (written and drawn by David Pugh, Black Library, 64 pages, 2000, ISBN 1-84154-125-7)
- The Redeemer (by Pat Mills, Wayne Reynolds, Debbie Gallagher, and Andy Jones, Black Library, 4-issue mini-series, tpb, 96 pages, 2000, ISBN 1-84154-120-6, tpb with 8-page bonus strip, 104 pages, 2003, ISBN 1-84154-274-1)
- Titan: God-Machine (by Dan Abnett, Black Library, 256 pages, 2004, ISBN 1-84416-123-4) collects:
  - Titan I (with Andy Lanning, Anthony Williams, and Marc Gascoigne, 64 pages, 1999, ISBN 1-84154-109-5)
  - Titan II: Vivaporius (with Andy Lanning, Anthony Williams, and Marc Gascoigne, 96 pages, 2001, ISBN 1-84154-144-3)
  - Titan III (with Anthony Williams, 96 pages, 2003, ISBN 1-84154-242-3)

Boom! Studios publications include:

- Damnation Crusade (by Dan Abnett, Ian Edginton and Lui Antonio, 6-issue mini-series, December 2006-ongoing, trade paperback, July 2007, ISBN 1-4276-0679-X)
- Blood and Thunder (by Dan Abnett, Ian Edginton, with art by Daniel Lapham, 5-issue mini-series, December 2007 to March 2008)

== See also ==
- Black Library gaming (Warhammer 40,000) for the miniatures and rules that have been based on the comics and novels
