= List of works based on The War of the Worlds =

The War of the Worlds (1898) is a science fiction novel by H. G. Wells. It describes the memoirs of an unnamed narrator in the suburbs of Woking, Surrey, England, who recounts an invasion of Earth by an army of Martians with military technology far in advance to human science. It is said to be the first story that details a human conflict with, and overall defeat by, an extraterrestrial race.

Following its publication, The War of the Worlds rapidly entered popular culture. Through the 20th and 21st centuries, the novel has been adapted in various media, including radio, television and film. These have been produced with varying degrees of faithfulness to the original text, with many of the more famous adaptations, such as Orson Welles' 1938 radio adaptation and the 2005 film directed by Steven Spielberg, choosing to set the events in a contemporary setting. In addition, many adaptations, including both of the Americanised above, relocated the location from its original setting of the United Kingdom in favour of the United States. A recent adaptation of this type was produced in Canada and broadcast on Britain's BBC (Autumn 2013) and BBC America (Summer 2014) for the centenary of World War I. It posits the Martian invasion as The Great Martian War 1913–1917, with the Martians invading Earth, first falling on Germany, and then expanding their war on mankind throughout Western Europe.

== Films ==
=== Adaptations ===
- 1953: The War of the Worlds (1953 film), produced by George Pal and directed by Byron Haskin, for Paramount Pictures
- 1975: The Night That Panicked America, a film that follows Orson Welles' radio broadcast based on Wells' novel.
- 1981: The War of the Worlds: Next Century, a Polish film by Piotr Szulkin
- 2005: H. G. Wells' The War of the Worlds (Pendragon Pictures film), directed by Timothy Hines, for Pendragon Pictures
- 2005: H. G. Wells' War of the Worlds (The Asylum film), directed by David Michael Latt (titled Invasion or The Worlds in War internationally), for The Asylum.
  - 2008: War of the Worlds 2: The Next Wave, sequel to The Asylum's film, directed by C. Thomas Howell
- 2005: War of the Worlds (2005 film), directed by Steven Spielberg and starring Tom Cruise, also for Paramount Pictures
- 2012: Alien Dawn: based very loosely on H. G. Wells' The War of the Worlds set in Los Angeles, Directed by Neil Johnson
- 2012: War of the Worlds - The True Story a sci-fi/action mockumentary, by Pendragon Pictures
- 2012: War of the Worlds: Goliath: Animated sequel set 15 years after the Wells novel
- 2021: War of the Worlds: Annihilation, produced by The Asylum
- 2023: War of the Worlds: The Attack, directed by Junaid Syed
- 2025: War of the Worlds (2025 film), directed by Rich Lee and starring Ice Cube, for Universal Pictures.

=== Parodies, homages, imitations ===
- 1984: The Adventures of Buckaroo Banzai Across the 8th Dimension, a science fiction comedy in which Orson Welles' 1938 radio broadcast described actual alien landings by in New Jersey. Welles is later forced to claim that the broadcast was fiction.
- 1990: Spaced Invaders, a comic film directed by Patrick Read Johnson in which Martians land in a small Illinois town at the same time as the local radio station is rebroadcasting Orson Welles' radio drama.
- 1996: Mars Attacks!, a science fiction comedy by Tim Burton, which spoofs many alien invasion films of the 1950s, including 1953's The War of the Worlds.
- 1996: Independence Day is a sci-fi action film that, in addition to dealing with a similar large scale invasion of earth by extraterrestrials, pays homage to Welles' work by having a computer virus which disrupts the aliens, an update to the pathogens that caused the downfall of the aliens in the novel.
- 2006: Scary Movie 4, a spoof comedy that uses Steven Spielberg's film version as its plot.
- 2017: Brave New Jersey, a comedy about a New Jersey town impacted by the Orson Welles broadcast.
- In Dennis Wheatley's WWII spy thriller They Used Dark Forces, the protagonist Gregory Sallust manages to infiltrate Hitler's bunker in the final months of the war, gain the German dictator's confidence and convince him that he is fated to be reincarnated as a Martian and lead a Martian conquest of Earth - and enthralled by that expected future, Hitler is content to commit suicide rather than try to resort to guerrilla war and prolong the fighting by another year.

== Television ==
- 1957: Studio One: Episode "The Night America Trembled", based on the Orson Welles' Mercury Players performance of a radio play version of H.G. Wells' War of the Worlds on 30 October 1938.
- 1975: The Night That Panicked America, an ABC-TV movie based on the events surrounding the Orson Welles' Mercury Players performance of a radio play version of H.G. Wells' War of the Worlds on 30 October 1938.
- 1988: War of the Worlds: Loosely based on Wells' novel, but mainly a sequel to the 1953 film.
- 1993: a planned animated series to be produced by New World Action Animation, a sister division to New World Animation Limited (formerly Marvel Productions) and subsidiary of New World Entertainment
- 2001: Justice League: an animated TV series adapts the main events and visuals of the novel for the three part story Secret Origins. Aliens, after destroying Mars, attack Earth via tripods and a team of superheroes, including Superman, attempt to stop them
- 2006: The Simpsons "Treehouse of Horror XVII" episode, "The Day the Earth Looked Stupid" takes the idea of the mass panic, but in the end once everyone realizes it was a hoax and they won't fall for it again, it turns out that aliens Kang and Kodos have successfully invaded Earth. The episode ends with the two aliens confused as to why they weren't hailed as the liberators of Earth, after destroying Springfield.
- 2013: The Great Martian War 1913–1917, a science fiction docudrama told in the format of an episode on the History Channel on the centennial of the first year of the War To End All Wars.
- 2019: The War of the Worlds: A three-part BBC adaptation set in Edwardian England.
- 2019–2022: War of the Worlds: A twenty-four-episode Fox and Studio Canal adaptation set in contemporary Europe.

== Radio ==
- 1938: The War of the Worlds (1938 radio drama), the Orson Welles' 1938 radio adaptation, script by Howard E. Koch.
- 1944: War of the Worlds radio broadcast, Santiago.
- 1949: War of the Worlds radio broadcast, Radio Quito, Quito, Ecuador.
- 1950: The War of the Worlds, BBC radio dramatisation adapted from the novel by Jon Manchip White, 6 episodes.
- 1955: The Lux Radio Theater: War of the Worlds, adaptation of the 1953 film.
- 1967: The War of the Worlds, BBC radio dramatisation using the 1950 Jon Manchip White script, 6 episodes.
- 1968: The War of the Worlds (1968 radio drama), WKBW radio adaptation.
- 1971: War of the Worlds radio broadcast, Rádio Difusora, São Luís, Brazil.
- 1988: The War of the Worlds, an NPR 50th Anniversary radio adaptation with Jason Robards, using a slightly updated version of the Howard E. Koch script.
- 1994: The War of the Worlds, a production of L.A. Theatre Works using the Howard Koch script and featuring several actors known for their work on Star Trek
- 1998: Orson the Alien, episode of Seeing Ear Theater, radio comedy/drama, broadcast 30 October 1998, including audio snippets from Orson Welles' 1938 broadcast.
- 2001: The War of the Worlds, a radio adaptation in two parts by Winnie Waldron, narrated by and with music performed by Winifred Phillips, for Generations Radio Theaters "Tales by the Masters" on NPR.
- 2002: The War of the Worlds, Glenn Beck's Mercury Radio Arts recreates the 1938 program live on Halloween 2002, using the exact Howard E. Koch script. The program was sponsored by Bill's Khakis.
- 2005: La Guerra de los Mundos, radio broadcast, Rock & Pop, Santiago, Chile, broadcast as promotion of the 2005 movie.
- 2017: The War of the Worlds, BBC radio dramatization adapted from the novel by Melissa Murray, 2 episodes.
- 2018: The Coming of the Martians, a faithful audio dramatisation of the original 1897 story by Sherwood Sound Studios starring Colin Morgan and produced in 5.1 surround sound.
- 2018: The Martian Invasion of Earth, an audio drama adaptation for Big Finish Productions, adapted by Nicholas Briggs, and starring Richard Armitage and Lucy Briggs-Owen.
- 2019: The Day Of The Martians, book #1 of The Martian Diaries trilogy by H.E. Wilburson. An audio dramatisation sequel to 'The War Of The Worlds' with original music by H.E.Wilburson. First broadcast in May and June 2019 by Radio Woking.

== Theatre ==
- 1978: War of the Worlds by Albert Reyes; premiered at the Nat Horne Theatre in New York
- 2004–2005: H.G. Wells' The War of the Worlds, a site specific theatre adaptation by Canadian playwright Ian Case staged in and around Craigdarroch Castle in Victoria, British Columbia.
- 2023: The War of the Worlds Stageplay, stage adaptation written and directed by Ian Chandler for Drama Workshop. Published by Amazon

== Music ==
- 1978: Jeff Wayne's Musical Version of The War of the Worlds, by Jeff Wayne
- 1984: Radio Ga Ga, by Queen references the radio drama through the lyric "through Wars of Worlds, invaded by Mars"
- 2009: War of the Worlds, by Marc Broude
- 2012: Jeff Wayne's Musical Version of The War of the Worlds - The New Generation, by Jeff Wayne
- 2017: War of the Worlds, an opera by Annie Gosfield, commissioned by the Los Angeles Philharmonic
- 2018: War of the Worlds, Pt. 1, by Michael Romeo
- 2022: War of the Worlds, Pt. 2, by Michael Romeo

== Games ==
- 1978: The octopus-like aliens of Space Invaders were inspired by Wells' Martians, as game designer Tomohiro Nishikado was a fan of the novel.
- 1979; 1982: The War of the Worlds, an arcade game published by Cinematronics, and its re-released color version.
- 1980: The War of the Worlds, a war board game designed by Allen D. Eldridge and published by Task Force Games.
- 1984: The War of the Worlds, a home computer game based on Jeff Wayne's Musical Version of The War of the Worlds.
- 1998: Jeff Wayne's The War of the Worlds, real-time strategy computer game.
- 1999: Jeff Wayne's The War of the Worlds, vehicular combat PlayStation game.
- 2003: The War of the Worlds d20 System supplement from Gold Rush Games.
- 2011: The War of the Worlds, a 2D action/platform game narrated by Patrick Stewart.
- 2018: Wings of Glory: Tripods & Triplanes, a miniature game created by Andrea Angiolino, Marco Maggi and Francesco Nepitello for Ares Games. On March, 18th 1918 Martian tripods invade Earth, so World War One comes to a truce as air aces from all nations cooperate to stop them.
- 2020: Grey Skies: A War of the Worlds Story, a stealth adventure game created by Steel Arts Software where you play as a character named Harper as she tries to survive the invasion.
- 2021: Darker Skies, survival Horror set after the War of the Worlds. The War is over, but the effects linger. Take control of Jack, a survivor of the War of the Worlds.

== Comic books ==
- 1946–1947: Edgar P. Jacobs produced an adaptation in the pages of the Le Journal de Tintin. An album released in 1986 was published by Dargaud.
- 1955: Classics Illustrated #124, a comic book adaptation of the book
- 1973–1976: Amazing Adventures #18–39 featured Killraven, a 21st-century freedom fighter against a second Martian invasion.
- 1977: Marvel Classics Comics #14, a comic book adaptation of the book.
- 1978: Waldemar Andrzejewski's 20-page comic book adaptation of the novel, written in Polish by J. Mielczarek.
- 1989: Scott Finley and Brooks Hagan's War of the Worlds is a six-issue miniseries from Eternity Comics which adapts the story to the Scottish highlands, focusing on a woman who's been the subject of alien genetic experiments. The Tripods are depicted as emerging from underground after centuries of stasis, prefiguring a similar conceit in Steven Spielberg's 2005 film.
- 1990: Sherlock Holmes in the Case of the Missing Martian published by Eternity Comics, is set in 1908, in the aftermath of the failed invasion. The story links the theft of the body of a dead Martian from the British Museum, fears of a second invasion, a plot by Professor Moriarty, and Holmes's retirement occupation in beekeeping.
- 1996: Caliber Comics' The Searchers features public domain characters from Victorian literature, with the miniseries Apostle of Mercy (written by Chris Dows and Colin Clayton with art from Art Wetherell and Tim Perkins) dealing with an invasion of the New England coast by Martian tripods.
- 1996: Caliber Comics' War of the Worlds by writer Scott Zimmerman and artist Horus adapts the story to then-future 2003, depicting a Martian invasion of the American Midwest and human resistance efforts around the fictional town of Haven. The major threat in this adaptation is the red weed, which here is aggressive and consumes humans on contact.
- 1999: Superman: War of the Worlds: events of the Wells book transferred to Superman's Metropolis and also involve Lois Lane and Lex Luthor.
- 2002–2003: Volume II of The League of Extraordinary Gentlemen, a limited series comic book written by Alan Moore and illustrated by Kevin O'Neill
- 2002 – present: Scarlet Traces, a sequel to the novel appearing in 2000 AD written by Ian Edginton and illustrated by D'Israeli.
- 2006: Boom! Studios' War of the Worlds: Second Wave is a six-issue miniseries by writer Michael Alan Nelson and artist Chee, adapting the narrative to contemporary times. The story's survival-themed arc ends with the Martians yet-undefeated.
- 2006: H.G. Wells' The War of the Worlds (comic), graphic novel
- 2008: H. G. Wells's The War of the Worlds: A Graphic Novel published by Stone Arch Books (re-published in 2014).
- 2018: H. G. Wells: The War of the Worlds published by Insight Comics.
- 2023: Orson Welles: Warrior of the Worlds. Milton Lawson (writer), Erik Whalen (artist). Scout Comics, Fort Myers, Florida, USA.
- 2024: Chris Mould's War of the Worlds: A Graphic Novel An illustrated adaptation of H.G. Wells' novel.
- 2024: War of the Worlds: Blood of Mars by Aaron Moran is a sequel to the novel that details a despairing, dwindling human resistance to the Martians and human efforts to commandeer a captured Tripod.

== Other ==
- 1994: War of the Worlds: Invasion from Mars, an Audio Theatre adaptation by L.A. Theatre Works, casting Star Trek cast members like Leonard Nimoy, Gates McFadden, Brent Spiner and directed by John de Lancie.
- 2005: The Art of H. G. Wells by Ricardo Garijo, the third in the series of trading cards, released
- 2008: Solar Pons's War of the Worlds, an online web serial set in the world of Solar Pons, combining elements of the original novel, the 1938 radio adaptation, and the Wells short-story The Crystal Egg.
- 2017: War of the Worlds 2017, a mixed web media story primarily told through Twitter, centered on a modern group of characters while retaining concepts from the original novel.
- 2017: The Day Of The Martians, book #1 of The Martian Diaries trilogy by H.E.Wilburson. An audio dramatisation sequel to 'The War Of The Worlds' with original music by H.E.Wilburson.
- 2019: Lake On The Moon, book #2 of The Martian Diaries trilogy by H.E.Wilburson. An audio dramatisation sequel to 'The War Of The Worlds' with original music by H.E.Wilburson.
- 2022: Gateway To Mars, book #3 of The Martian Diaries trilogy by H.E.Wilburson.sequel to 'The War Of The Worlds'.
- 2022: The War of the Worlds 1934, an Analog Horror web series depicting a Martian invasion of 1930's era britain.
- 2023: Unwell, a Midwestern Gothic Mystery, an American podcast produced by Hartlife NFP, mentions Orson Welles' radio broadcast and its reception by the public at the time in episode 5.5 "Outreach".

== 1938 radio adaptation by Orson Welles ==
Orson Welles's 1938 radio broadcast on The Mercury Theatre on the Air purportedly caused public outcry, as many listeners believed that an actual Martian invasion was in progress, although the reality of the panic is disputed as the program had relatively few listeners.

The radio drama itself has spun off a number of productions based upon the events surrounding the broadcast, including Doctor Who: Invaders from Mars, an audio drama released in 2002 based upon the Doctor Who television series that depicts Welles's broadcast as taking place during an actual attempted alien invasion.

== 1953 first film adaptation by George Pal ==
George Pal's film adaptation has many notable differences from H. G. Wells' novel. The closest resemblance is probably that of the antagonists. The film's aliens are indeed Martians, and invade Earth for the same reasons as those from the novel (the state of Mars suggests that it is in the final stages of being able to support life, leading to the Martians decision to make Earth their new home). They land on Earth in the same way, by crashing to the Earth. However, the book's spacecraft are large cylinder-shaped projectiles fired from the Martian surface from some kind of cannon, instead of the film's meteor-like spaceships; but the Martians emerge from their craft in the same way, by unscrewing a large, round hatch. They appear to have no use for humans in the film. In the novel they are observed directly feeding on humans by draining their victims' blood using pipettes; there is also a speculation about them eventually using human slaves to hunt down all remaining human survivors after the Martians conquer Earth. In the film the Martians do not bring the novel's fast-growing red weed with them, but they are defeated by Earth microorganisms, as observed in the novel. However, they die from the effects of the microorganisms within three days of the landing of the first meteor-ship; in the novel the Martians die within about three weeks of their invasion of England.

The Martians themselves bear no physical resemblance to the novel's Martians. The novel's aliens are bear-sized, bulky creatures whose bodies are described as "merely heads", with a beak-like mouth, sixteen tentacles and two "luminous, disk-like eyes". Their film counterparts are short, reddish-brown creatures with two long, thin arms with three long suction cup-like fingers. The Martian's "head," if it can be called that, is a broad "face" at the top-front of its broad shouldered upper torso, the only apparent feature of which is a single large eye with three distinctly colored lenses. The Martians' lower extremities, whatever they may be, are never shown. (Some speculative designs for the creature suggest the idea of three thin legs resembling their fingers, while others show them as a biped with short, stubby legs with three-toed feet.)

The film's Martian war machines do actually have more of a resemblance than they may seem at first glance. The book's machines are Tripods and carry the heat-ray projector on an articulated arm connected to the front of the war machine's main body. The film's machines are deliberately shaped like manta rays, with a bulbous, elongated green window at the front, through which the aliens observe their surroundings. On top of the machine is the cobra-like heat-ray attached to a long, narrow, neck-like extension. They can be mistaken for flying-machines, but Dr. Forrester states that they are lifted by "invisible legs"; in one scene, when the first machine emerges, you can see faint traces of three energy legs beneath and three sparking traces where the three energy shafts touch the burning ground. Therefore, technically speaking, the film's war machines are indeed tripods, though they are never given that designation. Whereas the novel's war machines had no protection against artillery, the film's war machines have a force field surrounding them; this invisible shield is described by Dr. Forrester as a "protective blister".

The Martian weaponry is also partially unchanged. The heat-ray has the very same effect as that of the novel. However, the novel's heat-ray is briefly described as having a spinning disk held up by a mechanical arm when first seen; it fires in a wide arc while still in the pit where the Martians first land. The film's heat-ray is shaped like a cobra's hood with a single, red pulsing eye, which possibly acts like a targeting telescope for the Martians. The book describes another weapon, the black smoke used to kill all life; the war machines fire projectiles containing a black powder through a bazooka-like tube accessory. The black powder when dispersed seems to have the same effect on life as the mustard gas of the First World War. This weapon is replaced in the film by the "skeleton beam", which fires green pulsing bursts of energy from the tips of the Manta-Ray body. The skeleton beams cause objects and people to disintegrate.

The plot of the film is very different from the novel. The novel tells the story of a late 19th-century journalist who journeys through Victorian London and environs while the Martians attack, eventually being reunited with his wife; the film's protagonist is a California scientist who falls in love with a college instructor after the Martian attack begins. However, certain points of the plot are similar to the novel, from the crash-landing of the Martian meteor-ships to their eventual defeat by Earth's microorganisms. Doctor Forrester also goes through some of which befalls the book's narrator: like his ordeal in a destroyed house and seeing an actual Martian up close. The film is given more of a Cold War theme, with its use of the Atomic Bomb against the enemy and the mass-destruction that such a global war would inflict on mankind.

== Unreleased adaptations ==
After the Second World War, Ray Harryhausen shot a scene of a dying alien falling out of a Martian war machine, as test footage for an abandoned project to adapt the story using Wells' original "octopus" concept for the Martians. A video of the original footage can be found on YouTube.

Here Harryhausen talked about his proposed adaptation:

"Yes, originally, after Mighty Joe [Young] I made a lot of sketches for War of the Worlds. I wanted to keep it in the period that H.G. Wells wrote it, of the Victorian period, and I made eight big drawings, some of which are published – in the book and it would have been an interesting picture, if it was made years ago. But since then so many pictures of that nature have been made that it wouldn't be quite unique as it would have been."

== Sequels by other authors ==
- Within six weeks of the novel's original 1897 magazine serialisation, The Boston Post began running a sequel, Edison's Conquest of Mars by Garrett P. Serviss, about an Earth counter-attack against the Martians, led by Thomas Edison. Though this is actually a sequel to 'Fighters from Mars', a revised and un-authorised re-print, they both were first printed in the Boston Post in 1898.
- The War of the Wenuses by E. V. Lucas and C. L. Graves (1898) is a parody of Wells's novel. In it London is invaded by Venusian women intent on raiding major department stores, notably Whiteley's. They can render men insensible using a 'mash-glance' (a 'masher' was period slang for an attractive young woman), so London's womenfolk resist them instead.
- In 1962, Soviet author Lazar Lagin published a political pamphlet named "Major Well Andyou" ("Майор Велл Эндъю"), a pun on "Well, and you?", which relates the story of a major in the British Army who collaborates with the Martian invaders. Lagin used the story to express current trends of communist thought in the Soviet Union, and injected analysis of political issues contemporary to the 1950s and 1960s.
- The Second War of the Worlds, by George H. Smith concerned the Martians trying to invade an alternative, less-technologically advanced Earth. Helping these people are an unnamed Sherlock Holmes and Dr. John Watson.
- The Marvel Comics character Killraven battles the second invasion of Earth in the year 2001. He first appeared in Amazing Adventures volume 2 #18.
- Manly Wade Wellman and his son Wade Wellman wrote Sherlock Holmes' War of the Worlds (1975) which describes Sherlock Holmes's adventures during the Martian occupation of London. This version uses Wells' short story "The Crystal Egg" as a prequel and presents Holmes as the man buying the egg at the story's end. Arthur Conan Doyle's Professor Challenger also appears. Martians are here simple vampires, who ingest human blood.
- In The Space Machine Christopher Priest presents both a sequel and prequel to The War of the Worlds (due to time travel elements), which also integrates the events of The Time Machine.
- In the novel W. G. Grace's Last Case (1984) by Willie Rushton, W. G. Grace and Doctor Watson avert a second Martian invasion by attacking the Martian fleet on the far side of the Moon with "bombs" containing influenza germs.
- The graphic novel Scarlet Traces (2002) begins a decade later with Great Britain utilising the Martians' technology, and ironic to the allegory of Wells' novel, have become more powerful because of it. This later leads up to a counter-invasion aimed for Mars in its own sequel, Scarlet Traces: The Great Game (2006).
- Science fiction author Eric Brown wrote a short story, "Ulla, Ulla" (2002) about an expedition to Mars, finding the truth behind H.G. Wells' novel.
- The London Pen (La cage de Londres, 2003), by French-Canadian author Jean-Pierre Guillet, takes place one hundred years after a second successful Martian invasion. Humans are penned like cattle and «milked» regularly by their new masters, who feed on their blood.
- Andrew Norris published Solar Pons' War of the Worlds in The Solar Pons Gazette (Volume 3.1, December 2008, pp. 19–33). In it Solar Pons, the Sherlock Holmes pastiche detective created by August Derleth, is involved, along with H.G. Wells, in a Martian invasion in 1938.
- War of the Worlds: Global Dispatches, edited by Kevin J. Anderson, an anthology of stories portraying the Martian invasion from perspectives other than that of the British. These include Howard Waldrop's "Night of the Cooters", set in Texas, and Walter Jon Williams's "Foreign Devils", set in China. (ISBN 0-553-10353-9).
- War of the Worlds: New Millennium (2005) by Douglas Niles in which the invasion is set in 2005 and focuses mainly on the American response. (ISBN 0-765-35000-9) Tor Books
- Kevin J. Anderson (writing as Gabriel Mesta) later wrote The Martian War: A Thrilling Eyewitness Account of the Recent Invasion As Reported by Mr. H.G. Wells (2006). It recounts the Martian invasion from a variety of viewpoints, and has ties to Wells's other work.
- Stephen Baxter's sequel The Massacre of Mankind was released on 19 January 2017 and takes place after the invasion. His related novella "The Martian in the Wood" also appeared in 2017.
- Mark Gardner and John J. Rust's War of the Worlds: Retaliation (2017) posits a human invasion of Mars in 1924, using captured Martian technology and led by historical characters including George Patton, Erwin Rommel, Charles de Gaulle and Georgy Zhukov.
- In Robert Heinlein's The Number of the Beast the protagonists visit several different versions of Mars. One of them is the home planet of the Martians who invaded Earth and who in this alternate history managed to hold on to their conquest. The protagonists encounter tribes of humans living in the Martian wilds, descendants of captive humans who had been transported to Mars by the conquerors and there managed to escape. Also on Mars, the wild humans still speak Cockney English — while the Martians' obedient slaves seem descended mainly from upper-class Englishmen.
- Sherlock Holmes: The Martian Menace by Eric Brown (2020) features Holmes having come out of retirement after the Martian invasion. Holmes is drawn into a complex plot to mount a more subtle second invasion of Earth involving replacing key humans with robot duplicates under Martian control. Assisted by a human resistance movement against the Martians, Holmes discovers that the original invasion was aided by Professor Moriarty, who initially served as an ally to the Martians until they trapped him in a complex device that kept him on the brink of death while forced to advise them. Ultimately Moriarty subtly provides the humans with information to thwart the Martian campaign, even arranging for Holmes to discover his continued survival so that he can turn off Moriarty's life support systems on the professor's request. Holmes later mocks the Martian leader that the Martians' invasion plan failed precisely because they abused Moriarty in such a manner, when if they had accepted his original terms he would have been a willing ally.
