= The War of the Worlds (disambiguation) =

The War of the Worlds is an 1898 science fiction novel by H. G. Wells.

(The) War of the Worlds may also refer to these adaptations thereof:

== Radio ==
- The War of the Worlds (1938 radio drama), a The Mercury Theatre on the Air episode on CBS
- The War of the Worlds (1968 radio drama), a remake on WKBW

== Film ==
- The War of the Worlds (1953 film), by Byron Haskin
- War of the Worlds (2005 film), by Steven Spielberg
- H. G. Wells' War of the Worlds (The Asylum film), 2005, by David Latt
- H. G. Wells' The War of the Worlds (Pendragon Pictures film), 2005, by Timothy Hines
- War of the Worlds (2025 film), by Rich Lee

== Television ==
=== Episodes ===
- "The War of the Worlds", Orson Welles' Sketch Book episode 5 (1955)
- "War of the Worlds", American Experience season 25, episode 6 (2013)
- "War of the Worlds", Ben 10: Alien Force season 2, episodes 12–13 (2009)
- "War of the Worlds", Brooklyn Bridge season 1, episodes 7–8 (1991)
- "War of the Worlds", Fire season 2, episodes 10–13 (1996)
- "War of the Worlds", Great Books season 2, episode 2 (1994)
- "War of the Worlds", Mysteries and Scandals season 2, episode 12 (1999)
- "War of the Worlds", Supernatural season 13, episode 7 (2017)
- "War(s) of the World(s)?", Cunk on Earth episode 5 (2022)

=== Shows ===
- War of the Worlds (1988 TV series), a 1988 sequel to the 1953 film
- The Challenge: War of the Worlds, the 33rd installment of the reality competition show airing in 2019
- The War of the Worlds (British TV series), a 2019 BBC adaptation
- War of the Worlds (2019 TV series), a 2019 Fox and Studio Canal series

== Video games ==
- War of the Worlds (video game), 1982, by Tim Skelly of Cinematronics
- The War of the Worlds (1984 video game), a computer game by CRL
- Jeff Wayne's The War of the Worlds (1998 video game), a real-time strategy game for the PC
- Jeff Wayne's The War of the Worlds (1999 video game), a vehicular combat game for the PlayStation

== Print works ==
- War of the Worlds: Global Dispatches, a 1996 anthology of stories
- War of the Worlds: New Millennium, a 2005 novel by Douglas Niles
- H. G. Wells' The War of the Worlds (comics), a 2006 graphic novel by Ian Edginton and D'Israeli
- War of the Worlds, a Birthright graphic novel by Joshua Williamson and Andrei Bressan

== Music ==
- Jeff Wayne's Musical Version of The War of the Worlds, 1978
- Jeff Wayne's Musical Version of The War of the Worlds – The New Generation, 2012
- War of the Worlds, Pt. 1, 2018, by Michael Romeo
- War of the Worlds, Pt. 2, 2022, by Michael Romeo
- War of the Worlds, an album by Bad Astronaut
- "War of Worlds", a 2003 song on Soundchaser by Rage

== Other uses ==
- The War of the Worlds (board game), a 1980 board wargame from Task Force
- The War of the Worlds II, a 1976 board game by Rand Game Associates
- The War of the Worlds (Gold Rush Games), a 2003 role-playing game supplement
- "War of the Worlds... II", Dinosaucers episode 27 (1987)
- ROH/NJPW War of the Worlds, an annual professional wrestling event

== See also ==
- Adaptations of The War of the Worlds
- Sherlock Holmes's War of the Worlds, a 1975 sequel to The War of the Worlds by Manly Wade Wellman and Wade Wellman
- Superman: War of the Worlds, a 1999 DC Comics publication
- War of the Worlds: Goliath, a 2012 Malaysian science fiction animation film
- The War of the Worlds: Next Century, a 1981 film by Piotr Szulkin
- War of the Worlds 2: The Next Wave, a 2008 sequel to David Michael Latt's film, directed by C. Thomas Howell
- War of the World by Niall Ferguson
- World at War (disambiguation)
- World war (disambiguation)
- War World (disambiguation)
