= List of mockumentaries =

This is a list of mockumentaries. Mockumentary or mock documentary is a genre of film and television, a parody presented as a documentary recording real life.

== Film ==
Mockumentary Films
Name	Year	Description
The 1 Up Fever	2013	Mockumentary about Bitcoin and augmented reality video games.
2gether	2000	Spoof of boy bands like N*Sync and The Backstreet Boys.
7 Days in Hell	2015	A fictional documentary-style exposé on the rivalry between two of the greatest tennis players of all time who battled it out in a 2001 match that lasted seven days.
ABBA: The Movie	1977	Mockumentary comedy-drama film about the Swedish pop group ABBA's Australian tour.
AIC 23	2013	Mockumentary about Film Studies professor Alan Poole McLard on his journey to make a documentary about Alice in Chains interviewing other musicians who have been influenced by the band.
All You Need Is Cash	1978	An updated version was released in 2002. A parody of music documentaries using a fictional counterpart of The Beatles.
The Atomic Cafe	1982	A black humor satire about the threat of nuclear war using only a broad range of archival material from the 1940s to 1960s.
Auditions	1978	Mockumentary about the porn industry.
BabaKiueria	1986	An Australian film on the reversed relations between Aboriginal Australians and European Australians.
The Baby Formula	2009	About a couple of two lesbian women who both get pregnant through an experimental stem cell procedure.
Behind the Mask: The Rise of Leslie Vernon	2005	A film crew follows around a serial killer in training.
Believe	2007	The story of multi-level marketing and a failed pyramid scheme.
Best in Show	2000	About the contestants at a national dog show; one of several mockumentaries written and directed by Christopher Guest.
Blue Hour the disappearance of Nick Brandreth	2023	Olivia Brandreth was nine years old when her father disappeared. Twenty five years later, she has returned to her childhood home to finally get closure in an unrelenting attempt to set the record straight.
The Big Tease	1999	A Scottish hairdresser's journey to the U.S. for a hairdressing competition, filmed with mockumentary elements.
Bob Roberts	1992	Tim Robbins satiric film about a right-wing folk singer's crooked election campaign.
Borat: Cultural Learnings of America for Make Benefit Glorious Nation of Kazakhstan	2006	Sacha Baron Cohen's outrageous depiction of an over-the-top Kazakh journalist's journey through the United States.
Borat Subsequent Moviefilm	2020	The sequel to Borat, which depicts the title character's second journey to the US, with an attempt to arrange a marriage between his daughter and a senior member of the GOP.
The Boys & Girls Guide to Getting Down	2006	A fictional guide to teach inexperienced youth about all things involved with "getting down", while also pointing out some of the pitfalls associated with the party lifestyle.
Brothers of the Head	2005	The story of two conjoined twins (played by real-life twin actors Harry and Luke Treadaway) who form a punk rock band.
Brüno	2009	About Sacha Baron Cohen's gay Austrian fashion journalist in a journey through the United States.
Burn Hollywood Burn	1998	About a movie director who prevents severe editing of his latest film by stealing it.
The Calcium Kid	2004	Boxing documentary charting the unexpected rise to fame of a milkman who is an amateur boxer.
The Canadian Conspiracy	1985	About a supposed Canadian plan to subvert the United States by taking over its media.
CB4	1993	"Rapumentary" starring Chris Rock about the story of a fictional group loosely based on N.W.A and 2 Live Crew.
Chalk	2007	The experience of three teachers and one assistant principal over the course of an entire school year.
The Clowns	1970	Federico Fellini's larger-than-life portrait of the art of clownery.
Comic Book: The Movie	2004	Direct-to-DVD release about a comic book fanboy dealing with the unfaithful film adaptation of his favorite character, set to the backdrop of the 2002 San Diego Comic-Con.
Confessions of a Porn Addict	2008	About a man's quest to get his wife back after she left him for being addicted to porn.
Confetti	2006	British mockumentary about a fashion magazine wedding competition.
C.S.A.: The Confederate States of America	2004	An alternate history take in which the Confederate States of America won the American Civil War.
Dark Side of the Moon	2002	A French mockumentary portraying the Moon landing as staged in a movie lot by Stanley Kubrick.
David Holzman's Diary	1967	A false autobiography by Jim McBride, which interrogates the art of documentary-making.
A Day Without a Mexican	2004	A fantasy satire in which all Mexicans in California suddenly disappear.
Death of a President	2006	A depiction of an assassination of then-President George W. Bush.
Death to 2020	2020	British mockumentary by Black Mirror creators Charlie Brooker and Annabel Jones which features a series of fictional characters discussing US and UK events of 2020 including the COVID-19 pandemic and US presidential election.
The Delicate Art of Parking	2003	Canadian mockumentary about parking enforcement officers.
Dill Scallion	1999	About the rise and fall of a country-western singer, much in the way of This Is Spinal Tap.
Dismissed	2024	Romanian mockumentary about a freelance journalist who investigates a mysterious AI corporation after a fire claims the life of its star employee.
District 9	2009	Includes elements of mockumentary in depicting the struggles of an alien species living in immigrant camps in Johannesburg.
Drop Dead Gorgeous	1999	A camera crew follows a beauty pageant contestants in a small town in Minnesota.
Dva kapitana II	1992	Russian mockumentary about the events of the early 20th century.
Electric Apricot: Quest for Festeroo	2008	Les Claypool plays the role of drummer-singer Lapland "Lapdog" Miclovik of rising jam-band Electric Apricot, heading to the holy grail of festivals, Festeroo.
Everybody Dies by the End	2022	A film crew follows a cult director for the creation of his final picture.
The Falls	1980	By Peter Greenaway, documenting the cases of 92 victims of the fictional VUE (violent unknown event).
Farce of the Penguins	2007	Direct-to-video parody of March of the Penguins.
Fear of a Black Hat	1994	The story of the fictional rap group Niggaz with Hats (N.W.H.), as it evolves alongside the genre, from its popular origins to the advent of gangsta rap.
Fellowship of the Dice	2005	Story of a first time gamer's introduction to the role-playing game world.
Finishing the Game	2007	Depicting the search for "a new Bruce Lee" to finish The Game of Death.
First on the Moon	2005	Russian mockumentary about a fictional 1930s Soviet landing on the Moon.
The Flying Scissors	2009	Following a handful of individuals preparing for a rock-paper-scissors competition.
Forgotten Silver	1995	Peter Jackson's fictional documentary about a "forgotten" New Zealand pioneer filmmaker.
FUBAR	2002	About two members of the head-banger subculture (with a sequel in 2010).
Fudge 44	2005	An Irish mockumentary about six puppets in a financially impoverished children's puppet theater in Tokyo, who locals believe came to life and robbed a nearby bank to avoid being put out of business.
G-SALE	2003	Mockumentary about garage sale fanatics.
Gamers: The Movie	2006	About players trying to set a record playing a Dungeons & Dragons-like game.
Get Ready to be Boyzvoiced	2000	Following fictional Norwegian boy band Boyzvoice.
Hard Core Logo	1996	The final tour of an aged punk band, as a model for the death of "true" punk rock.
The Heavenly Kings	2006	Follows the fictional Cantopop boy band Alive, fronted by Daniel Wu, who also directed the film.
A Hole in My Heart	2004	About a man who films a porn in his apartment with the help of a friend and an attention-seeking starlet.
Houston, We Have a Problem! (film)	2016	About the Yugoslavia space program sold to the USA.
I'm Still Here	2010	Satirical film revolving around the life of actor Joaquin Phoenix as he announces his retirement from acting in favor of a career as a hip-hop artist.
Incident at Loch Ness	2004	About a filmmaker (Werner Herzog) attempting to make a documentary about the mythological Loch Ness Monster.
Interview with the Assassin	2002	About a cameraman who obtains the confession of the actual assassin who shot John F. Kennedy.
It's All Gone Pete Tong	2004	Comedy following the tragic life of legendary DJ Frankie Wilde, from his peak to his battle with a hearing disorder.
I, Tonya	2017	Black comedy focusing on the life and career of figure skater Tonya Harding and the assault on rival skater Nancy Kerrigan.
Jackie's Back	1999	Comedy chronicle of the life and career of Jackie Washington (Jenifer Lewis), a 1960s/1970s R&B diva vying for a comeback.
Kenny	2006	The life of a portable toilet installer in Melbourne, Australia.
Killing Gunther	2017	About a group of assassins banding together to kill the world's greatest hitman, Gunther (Arnold Schwarzenegger).
The Last Polka	1985	John Candy and Eugene Levy mockumentary about the last concert of the Shmenge Brothers, characters developed on Second City Television.
LolliLove	2004	A story about a husband and wife team (James Gunn and Jenna Fischer) who form a self-serving charity to give lollipops to the homeless.
The Making of '...And God Spoke'	1994	A mockumentary about the filming of a low budget film on the Bible.
Man Bites Dog	1992	Belgian black comedy in which a film crew follows a serial killer documenting his crimes.
Man of the Year	1995	A satirical look directed by former Playgirl Man of the Year Dirk Shafer, about his reign as a closeted gay man.
Mascots	2016	Netflix film about the competition for the World Mascot Association's Gold Fluffy Award.
The Mating Habits of the Earthbound Human	1999	A film that satirizes human relationships, dating, and sex.
Medusa: Dare to Be Truthful	1992	"Behind the scenes" exposé of fictional pop singer Medusa on her "Blonde Leading the Blonde" concert tour.
A Mighty Wind	2003	The story of three folk singer groups who reunite for a tribute concert; one of several mockumentaries by Christopher Guest.
Mike Bassett: England Manager	2001	The fortunes of a lackluster England football manager in the World Cup.
Mister America	2019	Tim Heidecker plays a fictionalized version of himself running for district attorney to unseat the incumbent who tried to imprison him.
The Moment	2026	Charli XCX plays a fictionalized version of herself grappling with fame at the tail-end of 2024's Brat Summer and the beginning of her first headlining arena tour.
Morris: A Life with Bells On	2009	British spoof documentary about morris dancing.
The Mother of Invention	2009	Comedy following a failed inventor competing against his rival for an annual young inventor's award.
Mutant Swinger from Mars	2009	A long-lost 1950s sci-fi film (spoof) that opens with a mockumentary about the film and its director.
Never Been Thawed	2005	About people who collect frozen TV dinners.
The Old Negro Space Program	2004	Short subject in the style of a Ken Burns film depicting the fictional "Negro American Space Society of Astronauts" (NASSA).
The Nona Tapes	1995	Mock short documentary about the band Alice in Chains.
On the Ropes	2011	About a rivalry between a boxing gym and martial arts school.
Once they had been Stars	2020	Mock documentary directed by Malte Wirtz about two wannabe YouTube stars.
Paranormal Entity	2009	About a widowed family that are believed to be haunted by a demon.
Popstar: Never Stop Never Stopping	2016	Follows Conner4Real (Andy Samberg), a parody of Justin Bieber in the style of a concert documentary.
Punishment Park	1971	A pseudo-documentary purporting to be news coverage of soldiers escorting a group of anti-establishment citizens across the desert as punishment.
Real Life	1979	Mock documentary directed by Albert Brooks about a year in the life of an average American family, spoofing PBS-style documentaries.
The Real Will Wood	2020	Mockumentary Concert film created by Will Wood. It follows a desperate documentarian as he tires to figure out: who is the real Will Wood?
Reboot Camp	2020	A mockumentary by Ivo Raza about a fake self-help group full of Hollywood celebrities that turns into a cult.
Shooting Bokkie	2003	About a South African film crew creating a documentary on a 13-year-old assassin (a bokkie).
Savageland	2015	A horror mockumentary about a mysterious massacre in a small town in Arizona.
Sons of Provo	2004	Musical mockumentary about a Mormon boy-band and its rise to local fame in Utah.
State of Bacon	2013	About all things bacon, including the world's largest festival dedicated to it.
Steamin' and Dreamin': The Grandmaster Cash Story	2009	Comedy that follows the exploits of Cork hip-hop artist Grandmaster Cash.
Surf's Up	2007	Animated mockumentary that follows the progress of a surfer penguin as he enters a surfing competition.
Sweet and Lowdown	1999	By Woody Allen, includes elements of mockumentary depicting the life of a fictional jazz guitarist from the 1930s.
Take the Money and Run	1969	The second film ever directed by Woody Allen, in which Allen plays an ambitious but clumsy burglar.
Tanner '88	1988	The campaign of fictional former Michigan U.S. representative Jack Tanner in his bid for the Democratic party's 1988 presidential nomination.
Theater Camp	2023	About the staff of a theater camp trying to keep the business afloat when its owner falls into a coma.
This Is Spinal Tap	1984	A film crew follows a British hard rock band attempting to revive their popularity; the first of several mockumentaries written by Christopher Guest.
Tour de Pharmacy	2017	An HBO mockumentary that chronicles doping in the professional cycling world.
The Tunnel	2011	A documentary crew encounters a ghoul in the tunnels below Sydney.
Waiting for Guffman	1996	A small Missouri town's celebration of its sesquicentennial; one of several mockumentaries co-starring, and written and directed by Christopher Guest.
We Make Movies	2017	About an egotistical student filmmaker who gathers his friends to help make a movie for their local film festival.
What We Do in the Shadows	2014	Comedy-horror film about a group of vampires sharing a flat in Wellington, New Zealand.
World War III	1998	A German film depicting what might have transpired if Soviet troops had opened fire on demonstrators in Berlin in the fall of 1989.
Zelig	1983	By Woody Allen, about a man who changes his physical appearance in order to fit in.

=== Specials and one-offs ===
Specials and one-offs
Name	Year	Description
Introducing Tony Ferrino: Who and Why?: A Quest	1997	Steve Coogan's parody of cheap promotional videos for his Portuguese singer character; written with Peter Baynham.
Larry David: Curb Your Enthusiasm	1999	HBO Special about the making of an HBO special.
MyMusic	2012–2014	Web series about a dysfunctional music company.
The Naked Brothers Band: The Movie	2005	Stars two real-life brothers Nat and Alex Wolff and their real-life friends.
Norbert Smith - a Life	1989	A project by Harry Enfield satirising TV arts show biographies, British films, and the British acting fraternity.
Oil Gobblers (Ropáci)	1988	A film by Jan Svěrák about creatures that live in underground mines and feed on oil, plastic, and rubbish.
Platinum Weird	2006	A VH1 mockumentary about a band formed by Dave Stewart and Kara DioGuardi.

=== Commercials ===
Commercials
Name	Year	Description
ESPN's "This is SportsCenter"	1995–present	A series of commercials for SportsCenter presented in a mockumentary style.

=== Television specials ===
Television specials
Name	Year	Description
Alternative 3	1977	TV movie of a political conspiracy to establish a settlement on Mars.
Galaxy Quest: 20th Anniversary, The Journey Continues	1999	A promotional mockumentary presenting the Galaxy Quest television series as a real cult series.
The Great Martian War 1913–1917	2013	TV production depicting an alternate history in which World War I was fought against Martian invaders.
How to Irritate People	1968	A TV broadcast predating Monty Python, written by John Cleese and Graham Chapman.
Morto Troisi, viva Troisi!	1982	A fake report about Massimo Troisi's death, directed by Troisi himself.
Pat Paulsen for President	1968	TV special about the fictional presidential campaign of comedian Pat Paulsen.
Space Odyssey: Voyage to the Planets	2004	About a fictional crewed voyage through the Solar System, presented in documentary style.
Tout ça (ne nous rendra pas la Belgique)	2006	A hoax news bulletin on a Belgian television network that claimed the Flemish parliament had declared independence.

=== Individual episodes ===
Sometimes an episode of an otherwise non-mockumentary series is presented as a mockumentary.

Individual Episodes
Series	Episode Title(s) and Year(s)	Description
3rd Rock from the Sun	"The Loud Solomon Family: a Dickumentary" (2000)	An episode presented in an entirely documentary style, taking a look into the lives of the Solomon family.
Babylon 5	"And Now for a Word" (1995), "The Illusion of Truth" (1997), and "The Deconstruction of Falling Stars" (1997)	Episodes framed as documentaries by the fictional news network ISN.
Blue Mountain State	"One Week" (2011)	A documentary crew follows the team on and off the field.
Bones	"The Movie in the Making" (2016)	Made to look like an episode of a fictional documentary TV show focusing on the work of the FBI and Jeffersonian Institute.
The Comic Strip Presents	"Bad News Tour" (1983) and "More Bad News" (1988)	Follows an incompetent rock group on tour.
Community	"Intermediate Documentary Filmmaking" (2011)	Pierce tells the study group he's dying and asks Abed to film his last wishes.
Community	"Wedding Videography" (2015)	Abed films a documentary about Garrett and Stacy's wedding.
Entourage	"Welcome to the Jungle" (2007)	An episode presented as a mock "making of" film about Medellín, the film the characters produce.
ER	"Ambush" (1997)	A live episode portrayed as a documentary.
Escape the Night	"Monsters of Everlock" (2018)	Delves into the different monsters that were featured in the show, presented as found footage.
Even Stevens	"Band on the Roof" (2001)	A "rockumentary"-style episode following the band the Twitty-Steven Connection.
Family Guy	"Inside Family Guy" (2016)	A "behind-the-scenes"-style episode on the making of the show.
Farscape	"A Constellation of Doubt" (2002)	Most of the episode consists of a fictional documentary detailing humanity's reaction to Moya's recent visit to Earth.
Grey's Anatomy	"These Arms of Mine" (2011)	A documentary crew visits the hospital six months after a shooting to document the road to recovery.
House	"Ugly" (2007)	A camera follows a patient around the hospital as Dr. House treats him.
Just Shoot Me!	"A&E Biography: Nina Van Horn" (2001)	A faux A&E Biography of the character played by Wendie Malick.
Monk	"Mr. Monk's 100th Case" (2008)	A fictional TV special (mockumentary style) about Monk's 100th case.
Night Court	"A Closer Look" (1990)	Shows the affairs of the show from a news TV perspective.
Raising Hope	"Modern Wedding" (2013)	Sabrina's mother hires the film crew of Modern Family to document her wedding.
The Simpsons	"Behind the Laughter" (2000)	A Behind the Music-style exposé.
Stargate SG-1	"Wormhole X-Treme!" (2001) and "200" (2006)	Episodes mocking itself and the sci-fi genre, with a show-within-a-show parody and imagined storylines.
WandaVision	"Breaking the Fourth Wall" (2021)	An homage to early mockumentary sitcoms like Modern Family and The Office (American TV series).
The West Wing	"Access" (2004)	A fake behind-the-scenes documentary about a day in the White House.
The X-Files	"X-Cops" (2000)	An episode made to look like an episode of the actual show COPS.

== Other mock films and television ==
=== Reality shows ===
Reality shows
Name	Year	Description
The Comeback	2005	A reality show following the life of former "it" actress Valerie Cherish.
Double the Fist	2004–2008	A fictional version of Jackass.
Drawn Together	2004–2007	A cartoon version of The Surreal Life.
Late Night with the Devil	2023	A 1970s talk show that invites an allegedly possessed girl onto the program, accidentally unleashing evil.
V/H/S/99: Ozzy's Dungeon	2022	A segment about a dangerous children's TV game show whose host is later kidnapped by the parents of an injured contestant.
Series 7: The Contenders	2001	A film presented as a marathon of a reality show where contestants must hunt and kill each other.
Siberia	2013	A horror series about a fictional reality show where contestants must survive in Tunguska, but things go horribly wrong.

=== News programs ===
News programs
Name	Year	Description
Countdown to Looking Glass	1984	A docu-drama presented as a series of news reports about an escalating conflict that leads to nuclear war.
Ghostwatch	1992	BBC television special in which a fictitious "live" paranormal investigation goes awry.
Local 58	2015–present	A web series of a fictional public access television channel that is continuously hijacked with ominous broadcasts.
Europe on the Brink: War with America	1993	A cold war emerges between Europe and North America.
Not For Broadcast	2022	A full-motion video game where the player runs a national television news program in an increasingly authoritarian dystopia.
Special Bulletin	1983	An NBC made-for-TV movie portraying a live broadcast of a nuclear terrorism incident in Charleston, South Carolina.
The Second Civil War	1997	The television film details the build-up to an ethnically fueled civil war in an alternate future United States as a result of unsustainably excessive immigration, political self-interest, and ratings-pursuing news media.
V/H/S/94: Storm Drain	2021	A film segment in the form of cable news reports about an urban legend cryptid known as the "Rat Man".
Without Warning	1994	A TV film in the form of a mock newscast covering an apocalyptic alien attack scenario.

== Found footage ==
Some films and shows take the form of (fake) raw footage.

Found footage
Name	Year	Description
Be My Cat: A Film for Anne	2015	A young man in Romania goes to shocking extremes to convince Hollywood actress Anne Hathaway to star in his film.
The Blair Witch Project	1999	Three student filmmakers disappear while hiking to film a documentary about a local legend, the Blair Witch.
Cannibal Holocaust	1980	An anthropologist leads a rescue team into the Amazon rainforest to locate a missing crew of filmmakers.
Chronicle	2012	Three high-school seniors form a bond after gaining telekinetic abilities from an unknown object.
Cloverfield	2008	Follows six young New Yorkers on the night a gigantic monster attacks the city.
Creep (film series)	2014–2017	American psychological horror films about videographers recording eccentric people.
The Devil Inside	2012	Traces the purported exorcism of a possessed woman convicted of a triple murder.
End of Watch	2012	Focuses on the day-to-day work of two Los Angeles Police Department officers.
Gang Tapes	2001	When a carjacking yields a videocamera, a teenage boy decides to document his life and fellow gangbangers.
The Last Exorcism	2010	An evangelical minister participates in a documentary that films his final exorcism.
Paranormal Activity	2007	A young couple are haunted by a supernatural presence in their home.
Project X	2012	Three friends plan to gain popularity by throwing a party, which quickly escalates out of their control.
[•REC] (film series)	2007–2014	Spanish supernatural zombie horror film franchise.
September Tapes	2004	A man hunts down Osama bin Laden.
The Troll Hunter	2010	A team of film students documents the work of a troll hunter with the secret Norwegian Troll Service.
V/H/S (film series)	2012–present	American anthology horror films featuring a series of found-footage shorts.
Zero Day	2003	An indie film based on the Columbine High School shooting.
