= Cool Beans World =

Website for webcomics

Cool Beans World was a subscription website which published animated or partially animated webcomics. It was conceived by Cool Beans Productions, a design, animation and production company based in Sheffield, England. Contributors included, amongst others, UK-based comic book creators Pat Mills, Simon Bisley, John Bolton and Kevin O'Neill, and the author Clive Barker. Serialised content included Scarlet Traces and Marshal Law.

After a high-profile publicity campaign including extensive print advertising, the website was launched in 2001. It won Internet Magazine's "Site of the Month" award in October 2001.

When Cool Beans Productions went into administrative receivership in May 2002, Cool Beans World ceased operation. As of 2016, its domain is untenanted.

Comics included: Dark Frankenstein, Marshall Law, Scarlet Traces, Kingdom of the Wicked, The Yattering & Jack, Someplace Strange, Bone'Ed.

CG short films: Saintly, Marshall Law.
