= World at War =

World at War could be an alternative name for World War II

World(s) at War may also refer to:

- Another name for the Darkness Series (2000–2005) by Harry Turtledove
- The World at War (film) (1942), propaganda film produced by the Office of War Information
- The World at War (1973–1974), British television series documenting World War II
- Call of Duty: World at War (2008), video game developed by Treyarch
- Gary Grigsby's World at War (2005), computer wargame developed by 2 by 3 Games
- Left Behind: World at War (2005), video film, second sequel to Left Behind
- Worlds at War, a 1989 video game
- A World at War, a board game that evolved out of Rise and Decline of the Third Reich

== See also ==
- Our Worlds at War (comic), 2001 DC Comics storyline
- War of the World by Niall Ferguson
- The War of the Worlds (disambiguation)
- War World (disambiguation)
- World War (disambiguation)
