= Dismissed (film) =

2024 Romanian film

- Official English-language poster
- Directed by: George ve Gänæaard, Horia Cucută
- Written by: Horia Cucută, George ve Gänæaard
- Produced by: Ayrton P. Bryan, Horia Cucută
- Release date: 20 June 2024 (Transilvania International Film Festival)
- Running time: 91 minutes
- Country: Romania
- Language: Romanian

Dismissed (Original title: Clasat) is a 2024 Romanian mockumentary feature film directed and written by George ve Gänæaard and Horia Cucută, about a freelance journalist who investigates a mysterious AI corporation after a fire claims the life of its star employee.

Dismissed won the award for Best Feature in the Romanian Days competition at the 2024 Transilvania International Film Festival.

== Plot ==
The story follows a freelance journalist investigating a corporation's attempt to cover up a fire that led to an employee's death. The investigation uncovers an artificial intelligence software intended to revolutionize internet content moderation, a toxic work environment, and the story of an employee who became problematic for the corporation after a religious conversion.

== Main cast ==
- Daniel Popa as Gabriel Vînătoru
- Dana Marineci as Andreea Mitu
- Emilian Oprea as Radu Dumitru

== Production ==
Facing financial constraints, directors Horia Cucută and George ve Ganæaard drew inspiration from American self-made YouTube content and Stephen King's Carrie, which reconstructs its narrative through character testimonies. This approach led them to develop a faux-documentary style, allowing for a credible story within a limited budget. The idea emerged in early 2023, coinciding with rising discussions about artificial intelligence, particularly after reading an article about Kenyan workers subcontracted for ChatGPT. The directors debated balancing a YouTube reportage aesthetic with cinematic elements, ultimately opting for a more naturalistic narrative without flashbacks or additional cinematic insertions. The film was independently produced on a micro-to-no budget, relying on the pro-bono dedication of numerous collaborators who contributed their time, talent and energy.

== Release ==
The movie premiered on June 20, 2024, in Cluj-Napoca, Romania at the 2024 Transilvania International Film Festival. More festival screenings followed in Alba Iulia, Timișoara, Sibiu, Oradea, Brașov, as well as Bucharest in the program Let's Talk About... Film at the Romanian Cultural Institute.

== Reception ==
=== Critical response ===
Ioana Moldovan from Romania Insider praised the film as a “low-budget, fully independently financed thriller disguised as a fake documentary,” commending its “densely plotted, clever” narrative and effective use of its limitations to create a compelling story.

Mihai Chirilov, the artistic director of the Transilvania International Film Festival, described it as “the most pleasant surprise of the entire Romanian Days section,” highlighting its “satisfactorily WTF proposal” and noting that, despite its low-budget indie production, it presented a “dense and sinuous plot” that one could imagine as a blockbuster if more funds were available.

=== Awards and nominations ===
Event (year)	Award	Recipient	Result	Ref.
Transilvania International Film Festival (2024)	Best Romanian Feature Film	Horia Cucută, George ve Gänæaard	Won	

== See also ==
- List of mockumentaries
- Pseudo-documentary
