= Ten Days in a Mad-House =

1887 non-fiction book by Nellie Bly

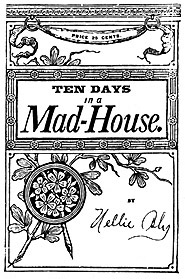
- Author: Nellie Bly
- Language: English
- Genre: Investigative journalism
- Publisher: Norman Munro
- Publication date: 1887
- Publication place: United States
- Media type: Print (hardback and paperback)
- Pages: 96
- Text: Ten Days in a Mad-House at Wikisource

Ten Days in a Mad-House is a book by American journalist Nellie Bly. It was initially published as a series of articles for the New York World. Bly later compiled the articles into a book, being published by Norman Munro in New York City in 1887.

The book was based on articles written while Bly was on an undercover assignment for the New York World, feigning insanity at a women's boarding house, so as to be involuntarily committed to an insane asylum. She then investigated the reports of brutality and neglect at the Women's Lunatic Asylum on Blackwell's Island (now called Roosevelt Island).

The book received widespread acclaim. The combination of her reportage and the release of her content brought her fame and led to a grand jury investigation and financial increase in the Department of Public Charities and Corrections.

== Research ==
Bly left the Pittsburgh Dispatch in 1887 for New York City. Penniless after four months, she talked her way into the offices of Joseph Pulitzer's newspaper the New York World, and took an undercover assignment for which she agreed to feign insanity to investigate reports of brutality and neglect at the Women's Lunatic Asylum on Blackwell's Island.

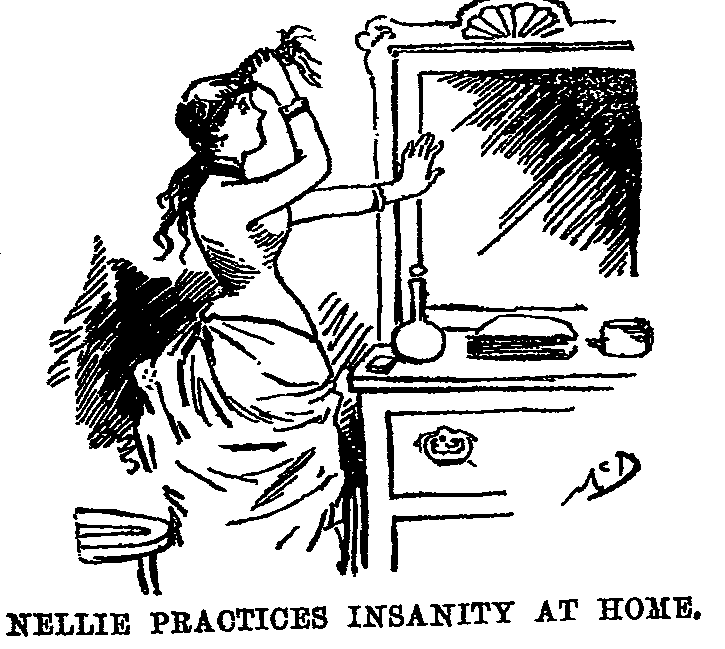
An illustration from the book, showing Bly's preparation for the project

After a night spent practicing expressions in front of a mirror, she checked into a boardinghouse. She refused to go to bed, telling the boarders that she was afraid of them and that they looked "crazy." They soon decided that she was "crazy," and the next morning summoned the police. Taken to a courtroom, she claimed to have amnesia. The judge concluded she had been drugged.

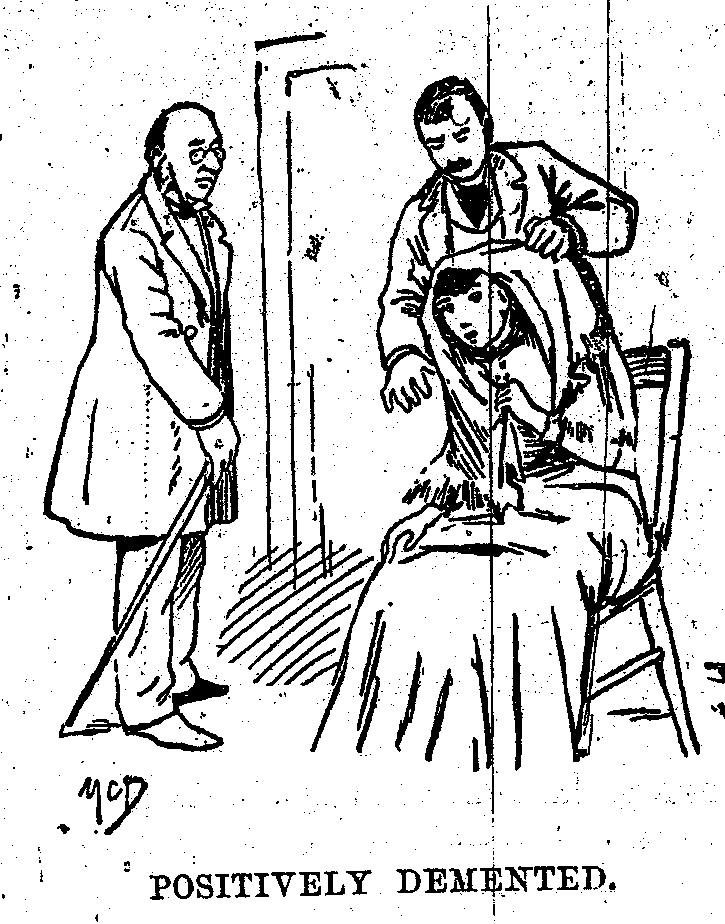
One doctor described Bly as "positively demented"

Several doctors then examined her; all declared her insane. "Positively demented," said one, "I consider it a hopeless case. She needs to be put where someone will take care of her." The head of the insane pavilion at Bellevue Hospital pronounced her "undoubtedly insane". The case of the "pretty crazy girl" attracted media attention: "Who Is This Insane Girl?" asked the New York Sun. The New York Times wrote of the "mysterious waif" with the "wild, haunted look in her eyes" and her desperate cry: "I can't remember I can't remember."

Once admitted to the asylum, Bly abandoned any pretense at mental illness and began to behave as she would normally. The hospital staff seemed unaware that she was no longer "insane" and instead began to report her ordinary actions as symptoms of her illness. Even her pleas to be released were interpreted as further signs of mental illness. Speaking with her fellow patients, Bly was convinced that some were as "sane" as she was.

Bly experienced the deplorable conditions firsthand. The nurses behaved obnoxiously and abusively, telling the patients to shut up, and beating them if they did not. The food consisted of gruel broth, spoiled beef, bread that was little more than dried dough, and dirty undrinkable water. The dangerous patients were tied together with ropes. The patients were made to sit for much of each day on hard benches with scant protection from the cold. Waste was all around the eating places. Rats crawled all around the hospital. On the effect of her experiences, she wrote:

What, excepting torture, would produce insanity quicker than this treatment? Here is a class of women sent to be cured. I would like the expert physicians who are condemning me for my action, which has proven their ability, to take a perfectly sane and healthy woman, shut her up and make her sit from 6 a.m. until 8 p.m. on straight-back benches, do not allow her to talk or move during these hours, give her no reading and let her know nothing of the world or its doings, give her bad food and harsh treatment, and see how long it will take to make her insane. Two months would make her a mental and physical wreck.

A particularly memorable experience for Bly were the baths that the patients received. The bathwater was frigid and buckets of it were poured over their heads, after which the patients were roughly washed and scrubbed by attendants. The bath water was rarely changed, with many patients bathing in the same filthy water. Even when the water was eventually changed, the staff did not scrub or clean out the bath, instead throwing the next patient into a stained, dirty tub. The patients also shared bath towels, with healthy patients forced to dry themselves with a towel previously used by patients with skin inflammations, boils, or open sores. Bly recalled the bathing ritual with trepidation, stating:

My teeth chattered and my limbs were goose-fleshed and blue with cold. Suddenly I got, one after the other, three buckets of water over my head—ice-cold water, too—into my eyes, my ears, my nose and my mouth.

After ten days, The World secured Bly's release from the asylum. Her report, published in The World and later released as a book, caused a sensation and brought her lasting fame. Of her release, Bly wrote:

I left the insane ward with pleasure and regret–pleasure that I was once more able to enjoy the free breath of heaven; regret that I could not have brought with me some of the unfortunate women who lived and suffered with me, and who, I am convinced, are just as sane as I was and am now myself.

== Reception ==
The question in hand was how Bly managed to convince professionals of her insanity in the first place. As revealed in her first hand account, Ten Days in a Mad-House, Bly spoke of how the main physician that performed her examination was more focused on the attractive nurse that was assisting the examination than with Bly herself. While physicians and staff worked to explain how she had deceived so many professionals, Bly's report prompted a grand jury to launch its own investigation with Bly assisting. The jury's report resulted in an $850,000 increase in the budget of the Department of Public Charities and Corrections. The grand jury also ensured that future examinations were more thorough such that only the seriously ill were committed to the asylum.

== Adaptations ==
=== Film adaptation ===
A low-budget independent film version of 10 Days in a Madhouse, starring Caroline Barry as Bly, Christopher Lambert, Kelly Le Brock and Julia Chantrey, was released in 2015 from Pendragon Pictures.

On January 19, 2019, Lifetime debuted a movie called Escaping the Madhouse: The Nellie Bly Story which stars Christina Ricci as Nellie Bly, Judith Light as Matron Grady, and Josh Bowman as Dr. Josiah.

=== Television adaptation ===
American Horror Story: Asylum drew inspiration from 10 Days in a Mad-House. Investigative journalist Lana Winters (Sarah Paulson) enters Briarcliff Asylum on false pretenses with the intent of exposing patient abuses, only to be discovered and committed for being a lesbian.

In September 2017, a TV series was announced based on 10 Days in a Mad-House, written by Sarah Thorp, starring Kate Mara as Bly, executive produced by Mara, Thorp, and Carolyn Newman for Entertainment One, Danjaq and The Frederick Zollo Company.

=== Stage adaptations ===
On September 21, 2023, an original opera by composer Rene Orth and librettist Hannah Moscovitch entitled "10 Days in a Madhouse" premiered at the Wilma Theater as part of the O23 Festival. The new opera was co-commissioned and co-produced by Opera Philadelphia and Tapestry Opera.

On August 19, 2022, Music Theatre of Madison premiered an original musical created by Jennifer Hedstrom and Karen Saari titled Ten Days in a Madhouse.

== See also ==
- Rosenhan experiment
- Psychiatric hospital § Undercover journalism
- Willowbrook State School § Geraldo Rivera exposé
