= 10 Days in a Madhouse =

2015 American biographical film directed by Timothy Hines

- Directed by: Timothy Hines
- Screenplay by: Timothy Hines
- Based on: Ten Days in a Mad-House by Nellie Bly
- Produced by: Susan Goforth; Marcy Levitas Hamilton; Strathford Hamilton; Donovan Le; Jessica Burgoyne; Jesse Zesbaugh
- Starring: Caroline Barry; Christopher Lambert; Julia Chantrey; Alexandra Callas; Kelly Le Brock
- Cinematography: Aaron R.F. Anderson
- Edited by: Stephen Eckelberry and Avril Beukes
- Music by: Jamie Hall
- Distributed by: Tricoast Worldwide; Cafe Pictures
- Release date: November 11, 2015 (United States)
- Running time: 111 minutes
- Country: United States
- Language: English
- Budget: $12 million
- Box office: $14,616

10 Days in a Madhouse is a 2015 American biographical film about undercover journalist Nellie Bly, a reporter for Joseph Pulitzer's New York World who had herself committed to the Women's Lunatic Asylum on Blackwell's Island to write an exposé on abuses in the institution. The production was written and directed by Timothy Hines with consultation from one of Bly's modern biographers, Brooke Kroeger. The film draws from Bly's book, Ten Days in a Mad-House, which led to significant reforms in the treatment of mental health patients. The cast includes Caroline Barry, Christopher Lambert, Kelly Le Brock, Julia Chantrey and Alexandra Callas.

== Plot ==
The film closely follows Bly's original account, and extracts much of the dialogue from Bly's 1880s exposé.

In an interview on Los Angeles talk radio, Caroline Barry described Christopher Lambert bringing authenticity to the part of the antagonist Dr. Dent by portraying his motives as misguided good intent rather than evil, adding to the realism of the film.

== Cast ==
- Caroline Barry as Nellie Bly
- Christopher Lambert as Dr. Dent
- Kelly Le Brock as Miss Grant
- Julia Chantrey as Anne Neville
- Alexandra Callas as Miss Grupe
- David Mitchum Brown as Dr. Canton
- Andi Morrow as Leona Fox
- Jessa Campbell as Tillie Mayard
- Natalia Davidenko as Mrs. Schanz
- Susan Goforth as Mrs. Stanard
- Katie Singleton as Mrs. Caine
- Everette Scott Ortiz as Dr. Field
- Talya Mar as Bridget McGuinness
- Rachel Bohanon as Miss Cotter
- Christopher Beeson as Dr. Ingram
- Saskia Larsen as Arena Pugh
- David Lee Garver as Dr. Kinier
- Darlene Sellers as Matilda
- Kaitlin O'Toole as Margaret McCartney
- Sam Davidow as Joseph Pulitzer
- Bob Olin as John Cockerill
- Sam Henderson as John Cockerill
- Tom Henderson as Bill Nye
- Jacob Timshel-Boatner as World Newspaper Journalist
- Michael Timshel as World Newspaper Journalist
- Bobby Braendle as Jury Member
- Jeremiah Rasca as Jury Member

== Production ==
Caroline Barry was selected for the starring role of Nellie Bly from an online audition, only two months after she moved from Colorado to Los Angeles to pursue an acting career. Barry recounted in a 2015 interview: "The director said he was looking for Nellie Bly's smile and that optimistic spirit, and he felt my audition was the one that really had that smile and the brightness and optimism."

Principal photography took place in Salem, Oregon, a location known for another film that shed light on injustices in the mental health world, One Flew Over the Cuckoo's Nest. The physical location was an abandoned mental institution with no electricity, which meant the actors had to perform in 10 degree temperatures, which Barry suggests added to the depth of the film's performances.

Other elements of the film were filmed later on sound stages in Los Angeles with additional cast members Christopher Lambert and Kelly Le Brock.

When Kelly Le Brock was cast in the production, she had 12 hours to prepare for her role. To accomplish this, she drew from her experiences dealing with mental illness of her past stalkers, as well as previous roles as a nurse.

== Release ==
The film was shown May 5, 2015, Bly's 151st birthday, on the opening day of the Bentonville Film Festival (Arkansas), an event founded by actress/activist Geena Davis to highlight women and minorities in the media. The film was released in theatres on November 11, 2015.

=== Box office ===
The film was a box office flop grossing only $12,165 against a reported $12 million production budget. Its final domestic box office receipts totaled $14,616. The film has since been released in European and Middle Eastern Markets.

== Reception ==
A reviewer in Ms. wrote: "I can honestly say this movie is a must-see. Nellie Bly's heroism and courage truly come to life on the screen, thanks to the work of talented up-and-coming actor Caroline Barry. Barry is instantly magnetic as Bly, and it's hard not to root for and fall in love with her character as the story progresses." The review ascribed the film's shortcomings as forgivable due to its relatively low budget: "And I can hardly blame Hines for the lack of funds to create a slicker product. The problem lies not with him, but with Hollywood." Paste wrote: "Bly's life is an intrinsically compelling one, and the failure of 10 Days in a Madhouse is that it never once lives up to the indelible nature of the life it portrays." The review cited the film's "B-movie camp" and its "one-dimensional characters, awkward, hammy acting and clumsy dialogue."

== See also ==
- Mental illness in film
