= Julia Chantrey =

Canadian actress

- Born: Julia Caitlin Annis; March 2, 1980 (age 46); Toronto, Ontario, Canada
- Occupations: Voice actress; improviser; actress
- Years active: 1991–present

Julia Caitlin Annis (born March 2, 1980) is a Canadian actress, known for her roles as Eva on Total Drama, and Amber D’Alessio in Mean Girls.

Born in Toronto, Ontario, Canada, Chantrey won the Gemini Award for Best Guest Actress in a Drama Series at the 17th Gemini Awards. In 2013, Chantrey performed the role of Nina opposite Oscar-winner Jessica Chastain in Oscar-winner Guillermo del Toro's horror film Mama.

== Filmography ==
=== Film ===
Year	Title	Role	Notes
2003	That Thing We Do	Heather	Short Film; credited as Julia Chantry
2004	Mean Girls	Amber D'Alessio	
2010	New Year	Jennifer	
2013	Mama	Nina	
2015	10 Days in a Madhouse	Anne Neville	
2018	This is as Far as the Road Will Take You	Rachel	Short Film
2020	Receiver	Detox Worker	Short Film
2021	Awake	Nurse	

=== Television ===
Year	Title	Role	Notes
1991	Material World	Mona	Episode: "The Little Me"
1995	Goosebumps	Tina Powell	Episode: "Phantom of the Auditorium"; credited as Julie Annis
1996	Dangerous Offender: The Marlene Moore Story	Young Spot	TV movie; credited as Julie Annis
1997–2000	Wind at My Back	Alice MacFarlane	15 episodes
2000	Phantom of the Megaplex	Terri	TV movie
2000	In a Heartbeat		Episode: "Friends Don't Let Friends..."; credited as Julie Chantrey
2001	Blue Murder	Jessica Dewson	Episode: "Family Man"
2002	Doc	Bonnie	Episode: "Second Time Around"
2003	Street Time	Sydney	Episode: "Hostage"
2004	Soul Food	Coffee Girl	Episode: "Two to Tango"
2004–2005	Darcy's Wild Life	R.J. Jarvis	4 episodes
2006	Obituary	Zara	TV movie
2007	The Best Years	Missy	Episode: "It Should Happen to You"
2007–2011	Total Drama	Eva (voice)	18 episodes
2008	Instant Star	Candy	Episode: "She Walks on Me"
2008	Flashpoint	Ashley	Episode: "Attention Shoppers"
2008	The Call	Sydney	TV movie
2009	Degrassi Goes Hollywood	Casting Assistant	TV movie
2009	Degrassi: The Next Generation	Casting Assistant	Episode: "Paradise City, Pt. 1"
2010	Skatoony	Eva (voice)	Episode: "I Stink, Therefore I Am"
2011	Rookie Blue	Nadia Reynolds	Episode: "On the Double"
2014	Not With My Daughter	Lynette Pritchard	TV movie
2015	I'm Not Afraid of Shia LaBeouf	Mia Goth	
2016	Incorporated	Server	Episode: "Vertical Mobility"
2019	Cardinal	Alanna Neven	Episode: "Lemur"
2019	The Handmaid's Tale	Videographer	Episode: "God Bless the Child"
2020	Obsession: Her Final Vengeance	Erin Winters	TV movie
2020	The Umbrella Academy	FBI Nurse	Episode: "The Seven Stages"
