= War World =

War World may refer to:

- War World (series), collaborative science fiction books set in the CoDominium universe of Jerry Pournelle
- War World (video game), a 2005 mech combat video game
- Warworld (DC Comics), a fictional planet in the DC Universe
- "War World", a 2002 episode of Justice League
- Justice League: Warworld, a 2023 U.S. animated film based on D.C. Comics

== See also ==
- The War of the Worlds (disambiguation)
- World at War (disambiguation)
- World war (disambiguation)
