= Susan Goforth =

American actor and producer

Susan Goforth is an American actress and producer.

== Life ==
Her work includes stage roles in Guys and Dolls, Me and My Girl, Singin' in the Rain, A Chorus Line and Follies. In 1999, she and her colleague Timothy Hines formed Pendragon Pictures, based in Seattle, Washington.

Two years later, the company proposed to make a version of The War of the Worlds with a budget of $42 million, anchored through venture capital. The two were in good shape on the film until the events of September 11 caused the film to shut down production. In the meantime, the two filmed Chrome in which Goforth took a supporting role. Later in 2005, the two released a low-budget version of H. G. Wells' The War of the Worlds in which Gofoth starred. She also produced War of the Worlds – The True Story, the 2012 War of the Worlds mock documentary found footage movie.

Goforth produced for Pendragon Pictures' 10 Days in a Madhouse, a feature film showcasing the undercover journalism of Nellie Bly. It was released in 2015.
