= Mihai Chirilov =

Mihai Chirilov (December 8, 1971, Tulcea, Romania) is a Romanian film critic and artistic director of the Transilvania International Film Festival- TIFF (Cluj- Romania).

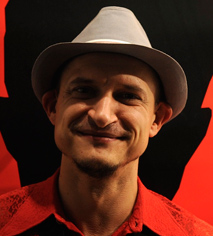

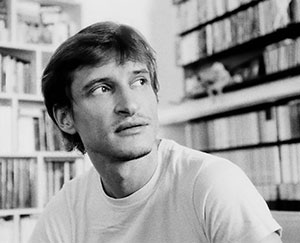

== Biography ==
Mihai Chirilov (Tulcea December 8, 1971) moved to Bucharest in the early 1990. There he started writing film criticism for the weekly Dilemma, and soon became vice director of another magazine called pro Cinema, also related to the Romanian TV channel.

In 2005 he founded the magazine Re:Publik, running it until 2008. He also wrote for Cosmopolitan, HBO magazine, Observator Cultural, Dilema Veche along others.

In 2002 he co-founded the Transilvania Film Fest together with producer-film director Tudor Giurgiu.

In 2006, Mihai Chirilov started to work as artistic director of the Romanian Film Festival in New York City founded by Corina Suteu.

During Fall 2011, Chirilov is the guest curator of the New Romanian Cinema series at Jacob Burns Film Center, Pleasantville (New York). The series includes the international acclaimed 4 Months, 3 Weeks and 2 Days by Cristian Mungiu (Golden Palm at Cannes in 2007), Police Adjective by Corneliu Porumboiu (2009) and The autobiography of Nicolae Ceausescu by Andrei Ujica (2010), along with a full retrospective of the work of filmmaker Cristi Puiu (The death of Mr. Lazarescu), and a special screening of Alexandru Tatos's Anastasia gently passes, in the presence of actress Anda Onesa. The program at J.B. Film Center was presented in partnership with the Romanian Cultural Institute of New York, and possible by the Fellowship for Understanding through Film, developed through a grant from Kathryn W. Davis with support from the National Endowment for the Arts and the Academy of Motion Pictures Arts and Sciences.

In 2012 Chirilov co-presents at MoMa (New York) the first U.S. full retrospective of Romanian veteran director Lucian Pintilie. For the occasion Chirilov curates a special brochure about Pintilie's career containing an exclusive interview which Pintilie gave to him just before the retrospective.

In 2012 he makes a special appear in Tudor Giurgiu's "Of snails and men", next to Valeria Seciu and Dorel Visan.

Chirilov has been serving as member of juries in many festivals, including Berlin (Berlinale), Gothenburg, Chicago, Palm Springs, Cleveland, Hong Kong, Moscow, Karlovy Vary, Milan- along with many others.

Chirilov is member of FIPRESCI (The International Federation of Film Critics).

He translated several Chuck Palahniuk's books into Romanian. He also wrote a book on Lars von Trier in collaboration with film critics Alex. Leo Șerban and Ștefan Bălan- Lars Von Trier- filmele, femeile, fantomale (Ed. Idea design & print 2006). Many of his articles have been published in anthologies.

Mihai Chirilov currently lives between Bucharest and New York.
