= World war (disambiguation) =

A world war is an armed conflict involving many nations.

World war may also refer to:

- World War I (1914–18)
- World War II (1939–45)
- World War III, a discussed future possible conflict
- World War IV, a discussed future possible conflict

== Arts and entertainment ==
- "World War" (The Cure song)
- The World Wars (miniseries), a History Channel series
- Worldwar, a series of novels by Harry Turtledove

== See also ==
- War of the World by Niall Ferguson
- The War of the Worlds (disambiguation)
- World at War (disambiguation)
- War World (disambiguation)
