= War of the Worlds: The True Story =

2012 US/British sci-fi film

- Theatrical release poster
- Directed by: Timothy Hines
- Based on: The War of the Worlds by H. G. Wells
- Produced by: Susan Goforth; Donovan Le; Jesse Zesbaugh
- Starring: Floyd Reichman; Jim Cissell; Jack Clay
- Narrated by: Jim Cissell
- Music by: Jamie Hall
- Production company: Pendragon Pictures
- Distributed by: Pendragon Pictures
- Release date: 14 June 2012
- Countries: United Kingdom; United States
- Language: English

War of the Worlds: The True Story is a 2012 American science Fiction Mockumentary Film directed by Timothy Hines. it is a re-edit and re-formatting of Hines's 2005 War of the Worlds Film adaptation.

The film portrays the events of the book as historical, through the documented recollections of a survivor of the Martian war.

== Concept ==
The film bases its documentary approach on the 1938 Orson Welles CBS radio broadcast of War of the Worlds, by presenting itself as a true account of actual events. Director Timothy Hines said, in reference to this technique, "When Orson Welles broadcast War of the Worlds on the radio in the 1930s, he presented it in such a way as to not clearly identify that it was a work of fiction. He did it for the drama. And many people took the fictional news broadcast as a real news broadcast. People believed they were hearing an actual invasion from Mars that night. We are approaching the story in the same way, as if it were an actual news documentary".

== Cast ==
- Floyd Reichman as H. G. Wells.
- Jim Cissell as Percival Lowell.
- Jack Clay as Jack Ogilvy.
- Anthony Piana as Henry James
- Susan Goforth as Amy Wells.
- James Lathrop as Mark Twain.
- John Kaufmann as Nikola Tesla.
- Anthony Piana as Jack London.
- W. Bernard Bauman as Teddy Roosesevelt.
- Darry Sellers as H.P. Lovecraft.
- James Lynn Sease as Albert Einsein.

== Production ==
The then-82-year-old actor Floyd Reichman, playing Bertie Wells, was recruited from the Theatre Puget Sound website by producer Goforth. Goforth played the character "The Wife" in flashbacks. Jim Cissell provides narration. Seattle-area actors Jack Clay (professor emeritus of the UW School of Drama) and John Kaufmann complete the main cast. The film's budget was "less than" US$10 million. Principal photography filmed at the Hogland House, a bed and breakfast in Mukilteo, Washington. Post-production work included "incorporating footage from the original film, archival stills from the period of the story, World War I footage, historical maps, photographs and other footage that will give the film the look and feel of a true documentary" according to Goforth and Hines. Editing took a "reported 3 1/2 years".

== Release ==
According to the production company's website, the film was scheduled for a July 2011 release, to be available only in theaters on select weekends.

In 2011, the film was scheduled to tour 50 cities in the U.S. and Canada. Co-Producer Donovan Le stated that opening on weekends would be the most lucrative, with "no internet distribution whatsoever until the movie has played out its run." Hines stated he was inspired by Kevin Smith's Rockstar Tour for his film Red State.

The film premiered in Seattle on June 14, 2012, to begin its 50-theatre tour of the United States.

To qualify for nomination for the Oscars, from December 18–24, 2012, True Story played in Pasadena, California.

== Reception ==
Gary Goldstein of the Los Angeles Times described the film as "clever like Wells" and "hugely inventive and ambitious," with an "eye-popping variety of" original and archival footage", matched to the period, adding, "War of the Worlds: The True Story," a mock sci-fi docudrama packed with a truly impressive —and clever —mix of editing (a reported 3 1/2 years' worth), special effects, visual artistry and offbeat storytelling. In closing, he wrote, "It's quite a production."

The Hollywood Reporter summarized the film as "mostly impressive for its technical achievements", and "despite the undeniable technical proficiency on display, it yields diminishing returns." Describing the integration of film from various sources, "Hines weaves the various styles of footage together in expert fashion, creating a relatively seamless effect. He's also been remarkably faithful to the source material" of Wells' novel. But the reviewer concluded: "But ultimately the viewer is less consumed by the story than in dispassionately admiring the craftsmanship on display. The dramatic scenes, filmed in sepia tones to blend in with the historical footage, are clumsily staged and acted. And the endless battle sequences blend in together in wearying fashion, making the film seem far longer than its 105 minutes."

In Ain't It Cool News the reviewer described True Story as "The best film I had the privilege of seeing this week", continuing, "I especially loved watching the attacks of both the aliens and the giant machines which have a Sky Captain & The World of Tomorrow look to them." He summed up the film as "one of the coolest little films I've come across in quite a while. As if the Orson Welles radio broadcast wasn't mythic enough, along comes this mock-doc to add a whole new layer of intrigue to H.G. Wells' fascinating story. Highly recommended to those who love revisionist history, alien invasion films, and thrilling real-life documentaries."

Shawn Frances, critic of the film review site, You Won Cannes, praised the film writing, "Ever since the 1953 movie adaptation of War of the Worlds there have been numerous other translations of Wells' novel, even a 1988 short-lived TV series, but of all the ones I have seen the only two—yes, only two—I find worthy of repeated viewings is the '53 film and this new 2013 docudrama."

The Port Townsend Leader, published in Hines' home town, described the film's visuals as "packing a punch" despite the limited budget, finding the "designs of the tripods and aliens much truer to the book" than in other films of Wells' story, and that "Hines uses [the aliens'] limited screen time well." The review noted that "scenes of destruction and panic tend to blur together after awhile" in spite of some "standout set pieces", and the sepia-toned palette of the film "loses its appeal". Concluding, the film "puts a unique spin on something that has been done many times before, which is no small feat."
