= Europe on the Brink: War with America =

1993 British television docudrama

Europe on the Brink: War with America is a 1993 British television docudrama produced for the BBC current affairs series Assignment. Presented by Francine Stock, it depicts a fictional future conflict between the United States and an increasingly integrated Europe in the year 2013.

The programme was directed by Marsh Marshall and written by Michael Blake. It was broadcast on 26 January 1993 as the third and final programme in an Assignment sequence titled Europe on the Brink.

== Background and premise ==
War with America was produced during a period of major political change in Europe following the Revolutions of 1989, German reunification, the dissolution of the Soviet Union and the negotiation of the Maastricht Treaty. The programme extrapolated contemporary debate about the future of European integration and relations between Europe and the United States.

Set twenty years after its production, in 2013, the programme presents a fictional conflict between Europe and the United States. Contemporary coverage described the production as a futuristic docudrama and noted that exterior locations were altered using special effects.

The programme combines the conventions of a current-affairs documentary with dramatised fictional events, presenting its imagined future as though it were being reported and analysed by a television documentary.

== Production ==
War with America was directed by Marsh Marshall, with a screenplay by Michael Blake. Francine Stock appeared as the presenter. The dramatised portions featured actors including Kenneth Haigh, as James Milner, and Peter Cellier, as Sir Brian Donleavy, with Wolf Kahler, Don Fellows, Akemi Otani, Alexandra Bastedo, David Graham, Terry Wale and Andy Lucas also appearing.

The programme formed part of a three-week Europe on the Brink sequence within Assignment. It followed Dying for Europe, broadcast on 12 January 1993, and The Heavyweight Contender, broadcast on 19 January. War with America concluded the sequence on 26 January.

== Plot ==
A global economic crisis in 1996 compels European states to establish a monetary and economic union. Waves of refugees fleeing civil wars across the Commonwealth of Independent States results in a wall being built on Europe's eastern borders in 2000. Far right and regionalist movements undermine national sovereignty, and eventually Europe becomes a political union by 2002.

A terrorist nuclear attack in Saudi Arabia leads to a massive deployment of US forces to the Persian Gulf to engage in a war which would eventually lead to 30,000 American casualties. Outrage over European non-participation results in the US withdrawing from NATO. The US becomes more racially polarised and political deadlock makes it unwilling to address its burgeoning national debt. A Hispanic President is elected in 2008, who in his inauguration declares the establishment of a 'North American Union' of the United States, Mexico and Canada (excluding Quebec, whose sympathies lie with Europe).

Meanwhile China breaks up into three regions. A rearmed Japan has effective political control over northern China, as well as parts of Siberia. Taiwan and Hong Kong have influence over Southern China through various warlords.

A series of trade disputes between the EuroFederation and the North American Union escalate, including competition for Arctic oil fields. The North American Union is linked to the assassination of the EuroFederation leader. The navies of the two blocs confront each other in the North Atlantic after European forces deploy into Quebec. An ultimatum is issued to the EuroFederation while it manages a constitutional crisis.

== Release ==
The programme was first broadcast in the United Kingdom on 26 January 1993.

An English-language recording of the programme was uploaded to YouTube in 2026.

== Cast ==
- Francine Stock – presenter
- Kenneth Haigh – James Milner
- Peter Cellier – Sir Brian Donleavy (former Vice President of the EuroFederation)
- Wolf Kahler
- Don Fellows
- Akemi Otani
- Alexandra Bastedo
- David Graham
- Terry Wale
- Andy Lucas

== See also ==
- Docudrama
- Mockumentary
- European integration
- Transatlantic relations
