= H. G. Wells' The War of the Worlds (Pendragon Pictures film) =

2005 film by Pendragon Pictures

H.G. Wells' The War of the Worlds
- Unrealized theatrical release poster
- Directed by: Timothy Hines
- Written by: Timothy Hines; Susan Goforth
- Based on: The War of the Worlds by H. G. Wells
- Produced by: Susan Goforth
- Starring: Anthony Piana
- Cinematography: Timothy Hines
- Edited by: Timothy Hines
- Music by: Jamie Hall
- Production company: Pendragon Pictures
- Distributed by: Allumination Filmworks
- Release date: June 14, 2005
- Running time: 180 minutes (Original Cut); 135 minutes (Directors cut); 125 minutes (Classic War of the Worlds)
- Country: United States
- Language: English
- Budget: $25 million (est.)

H. G. Wells' The War of the Worlds (Note: Also known as The Classic War of the Worlds, or War of the Worlds) is a 2005 American independent science fiction action film co-written and directed by Timothy Hines, based on H. G. Wells' 1898 Novel of the same name. It is the first film adaptation to be set in the novel's original Victorian England setting as opposed to modern day America.

The film received generally negative reviews from critics, who criticized its 180-minute runtime and special effects, while noting its faithfulness to the original novel. A re-formatted, re-worked version, War of the Worlds: The True Story was released in 2012.

== Premise ==
Set in late 19th-century England, the film follows a journalist from Woking known as "the Writer" as he struggles to reunite with his wife during a Martian invasion. After witnessing the arrival of the alien invaders and their towering tripod war machines, he journeys across a war-torn southern England while his brother attempts to escape London with two women amid the widespread chaos and destruction.

== Cast ==
- Anthony Piana as The Writer/The Brother
- Jack Clay as Ogilvy
- John Kaufmann as The Curate
- Darlene Sellers as Mrs. Elphinstone
- James Lathrop as The Artilleryman
- Susan Goforth as The Wife
- Jamie Lynn Sease as Miss Elphinstone

== Production ==
Hines had long desired to make his own version of The War of the Worlds after reading the novel at age eight. He initially wanted to set the film in-period, but eventually settled on a modern retelling. This version was to be set in Seattle, with a Martian attack preceded by neutralizing electromagnetic power; from there the tale's events would unfold and be as similar as possible to Wells' novel. Pendragon Pictures approached Paramount in 2000 with Plans for a remake, but nothing came of it.

Hines stated that after early Microsoft employees and others in the computer industry saw his desktop film, Bug Wars, a package of $42 million was assembled for the updated modern version. Katie Tomlinson was supposed to lead the cast as the lead character Jody, the foreign correspondent, and Susan Goforth was also set to star. Hines was also planning to shoot the film using the brand new Sony CineAlta HD system, which George Lucas had used to film Star Wars: Episode II – Attack of the Clones.

Production began in early September 2001, with plans to move into principal photography by October of that year, with a Halloween 2002 release date, but Hines abandoned this approach after the September 11 attacks. Two weeks later, with the support of Charles Keller, the director of the H. G. Wells Society, Hines began writing a new script with producer Goforth, while they were filming Pendragon's Chrome. The new direction taken would be to directly adapt the Wells novel, setting it in its original British setting and 1898 time period.

In 2004, it was announced that principal photography had finished under the cover-title The Great Boer War.

The 2005 book, War of the Worlds: From Wells to Spielberg, devotes a chapter to the Pendragon film. It states that the budget was "...approximately $25 million..."

== Release ==
The film was originally planned to be released in theaters on March 20, but this was scrapped and was instead released Direct-to-video by Allumination Filmworks on June 14, 2005. Hines claimed that the film never saw a theatrical release due to exhibitors pulling out, either from being bullied by Paramount, or through fear of reprisal from the studio.

=== Director's cut ===
A Director's cut was released in September 2005, removing forty-five minutes of footage. it was available on video in regions 2 and 4, but not in region 1, the United States and Canada.

=== The Classic War of the Worlds ===
Another cut titled The Classic War of the Worlds was released on December 25, 2006, which added new scenes, re-edits, and re-worked special effects.

=== War of the Worlds: The True Story ===
In 2012, a re-imagined, re-edited, and re-thought version, with new material added, was released under the title War of the Worlds – The True Story; this version, again directed by Timothy Hines, is presented as a faux-documentary. It revisits Wells' novel, portraying its events as historical by way of the documented recollections of a survivor of the Martian invasion.

The film bases its approach on the 1938 Orson Welles CBS radio Halloween broadcast of War of the Worlds, by presenting itself as a true account of actual events. Director Timothy Hines said, in reference to this technique, "When Orson Welles broadcast War of the Worlds on the radio in the late 1930s, he presented it in such a way as to not clearly identify that it was a work of fiction. He did it for the drama. And many people mistook the fictional news broadcast as a real news broadcast. People believed they were hearing an actual invasion from Mars that night. We are approaching the story in the same way, as if it were an actual news documentary".

== Reception ==
Although the film's score by Jamie Hall was well received, reviewers noted that the film felt very similar to the films of Ed Wood and the worst films lampooned on Mystery Science Theater 3000. One reviewer suggested the performances were like that in British period melodramas, and favorably likened the work to that of Karel Zeman.

The film as a whole received generally poor reviews by critics, who, while often praising the good intentions behind the project and its faithfulness to the source material, variously described the result as "unendurable" and "terrible in almost every way a movie can be", with "awful" effects. Reviewers also complained about the film's original three-hour running time.

Hines later said of the film: "I wanted to make War of the Worlds. But what I made was something that has a macabre cult following, like an Ed Wood movie. [...] I’ve learned a lot since my first outing. My heart is really in the new War of the Worlds – The True Story."

== Controversy ==
In July 2006 Pendragon Pictures announced in a press release that the Dark Horse Comics H.G. Wells' The War of the Worlds comic possessed visual similarities to Pendragon's film. Pendragon set up a website showing image comparisons and polling visitors regarding the similarities. In April 2008 Pendragon publicly announced the legal settlement of the matter, stating it "...apologizes for any misconception its press release or later internet poll may have caused".

== See also ==
- H. G. Wells' War of the Worlds, also titled Invasion or The Worlds in War, another direct-to-DVD film adaptation, produced by The Asylum
- The Great Martian War 1913–1917, an original made-for-television Canadian/British produced science fiction docudrama, first aired in 2013 on the History Channel UK during the first year of the World War I centenary
