= D'Israeli (cartoonist) =

British cartoonist

Matt Brooker
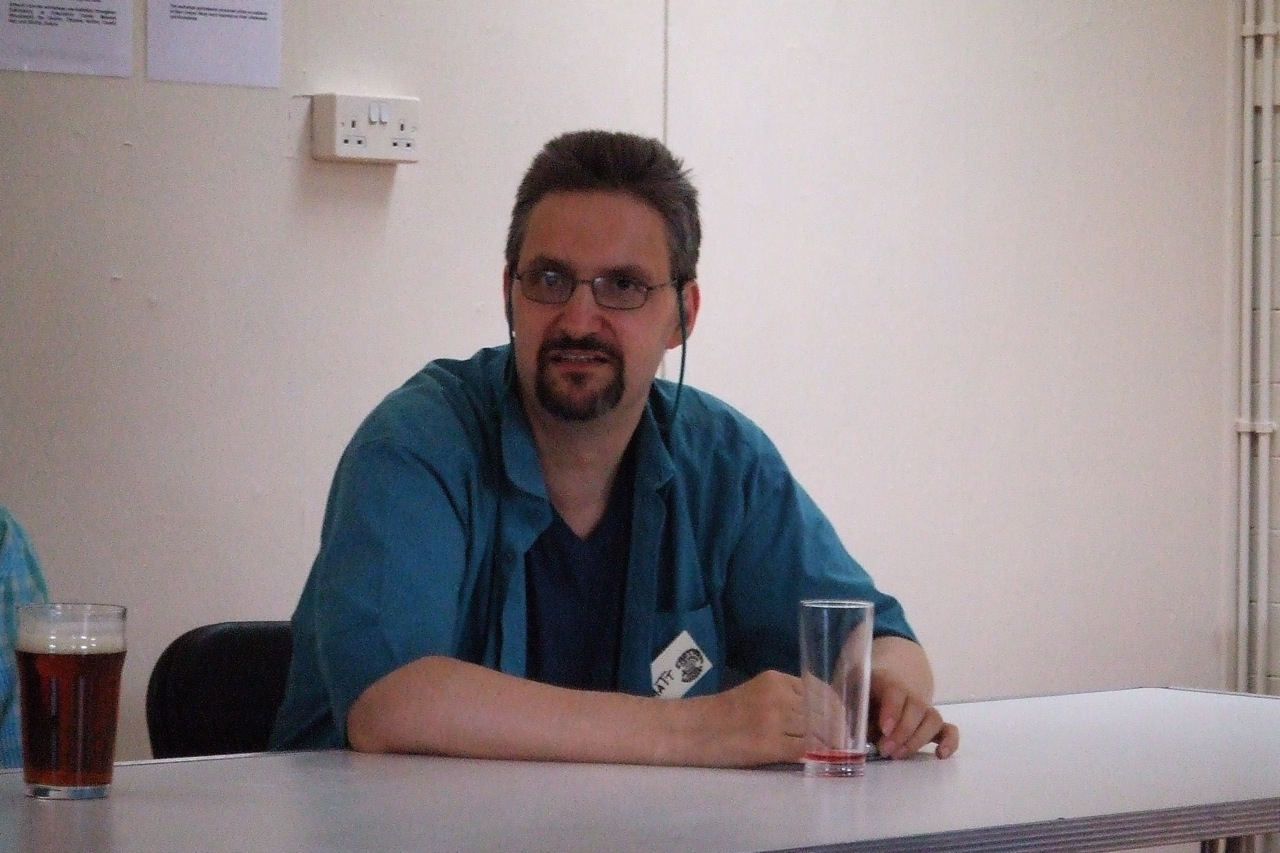
- D'Israeli at Caption 2008
- Areas: Cartoonist, Writer, Artist, Letterer
- Pseudonym: D'Israeli
- Notable works: H.G. Wells' The War of the Worlds; Leviathan

Matt Brooker, whose work most often appears under the pseudonym D'Israeli (sometimes "D'Israeli D'Emon D'Raughtsman"), is a British comic artist, colorist, writer and letterer. Other pseudonyms he uses include "Molly Eyre" (a pun on Molière) for his writing, and "Harry V. Derci"/"Digital Derci" (a pun on "arrivederci") for his lettering work.

== Biography ==
In 1988 he worked as the penciller on issues 7 to 12 of Mister X (volume two). His early work also includes the surreal Timulo, which appeared in Deadline magazine in 1989. Also in Deadline, he co-created Fatal Charm with Shane Oakley. In 1991 he co-created the cyberpunk series Lazarus Churchyard with Warren Ellis.

Kingdom of the Wicked, a graphic novel about a children's book writer who returns as an adult to the world he imagined as a child, only to find it at war, began a regular partnership with writer Ian Edginton. The pair have also created Scarlet Traces, a sequel to H. G. Wells's The War of the Worlds in graphic novel form, and Leviathan, a Victorian horror series which appeared in 2000 AD, and contributed a two-part storyline to the Batman event No Man's Land. With Paul Cornell, he created XTNCT, a satirical series involving genetically modified dinosaurs, for the Judge Dredd Megazine.

As a writer-artist, he has created Future Shocks for 2000 AD, and Consequences, a one-off sequel to Timulo. He has drawn Judge Dredd, worked as a colourist on Miracleman and 2000 AD, and as an inker on Neil Gaiman's Sandman and Grant Morrison's Kill Your Boyfriend. Most of his recent work is created directly on computer using Adobe Illustrator, with 3D modelling software used for some complex designs.

== Bibliography ==
Comics work includes:

- "God's Little Acre" (with Ian Edginton, in Revolver No. 2, 1990)
- Grendel:
  - "Devil's Whisper" (with James Robinson, in A1 No. 4, January 1990, Atomeka Press)
  - "Devil's Mate" (with Matt Wagner, in Black, White and Red, 1998, Dark Horse, 2000, tpb, Dark Horse, ISBN 978-1569714935)
- Lazarus Churchyard (with Warren Ellis, in Blast!, 1991, reprinted in Beyond 2000 AD then Judge Dredd Megazine, 2001, tpb, Atomeka Press, 1992, Image Comics, 2001, ISBN 1-58240-180-2)
- Metalscream 2099
  - No. 1 (with Warren Ellis, in 2099 Unlimited #4, April 1994)
  - No. 2 (with Warren Ellis, in 2099 Unlimited #7, January 1995)
- The Sandman
  - #58–60 (inks, with writer Neil Gaiman, artist Marc Hempel and colorist Daniel Vozzo, Vertigo, March–June 1994, tpb, 1996, ISBN 1-56389-204-9)
  - #61–62 (inks, with writer Neil Gaiman, co-inkers Marc Hempel, Glyn Dillon, Charles Vess, artists Marc Hempel, Glyn Dillon, Charles Vess, Dean Ormston and colorist Daniel Vozzo, Vertigo, July–August 1994, tpb, 1996, ISBN 1-56389-204-9)
- Tank Girl: "Movie Adaptation" (inks, with Peter Milligan, art by Andy Pritchett, and colours by Robbie Busch, June 1995, Vertigo)
- Judge Dredd:
  - "Alien Town's Burning" (colours, with John Wagner and art by Cam Kennedy, in 2000 AD #1133–1134, February–March 1999)
  - "Return of the Assassin" (colours, with John Wagner and art by Cam Kennedy, in 2000 AD #1141–1147, April–June 1999)
  - "Copycat Crimes" (colours, with Roland Grey and art by Dylan Teague and Kevin Brighton, in 2000 AD #1192–1193, May 2000)
  - "Master Moves" (with Gordon Rennie, in Judge Dredd Megazine No. 217, 2004)
  - "Tempus Fugitive" (with Ian Edginton, in 2000 AD #1390, 2004)
  - "Horror in Emergency Camp 4" (with John Wagner, in 2000 AD #1425–1428, 2005)
  - "Time and Again" (with Ian Edginton, in 2000 AD #1475, 2006)
  - "Time's Squared" (with Ian Edginton, in 2000 AD #1551, 2007)
- Nikolai Dante: "The Hunting Part" (colours, with Robbie Morrison and art by Andy Clarke, in 2000 AD #1139–1140, April 1999)
- "Bread and Circuses" (with Ian Edginton, DC Comics, collected in Batman: No Man's Land, Volume 2, 2000, ISBN 1-56389-599-4):
  - Batman: Legends of the Dark Knight No. 117 (May 1999)
  - Batman: Shadow of the Bat No. 85 (May 1999)
- Devlin Waugh: "Chasing Herod" (colours, with John Smith and art by Steve Yeowell, in 2000 AD #1149–1157, June–August 1999, collected in Red Tide, 264 pages, 2005, DC, ISBN 1-4012-0578-X, Rebellion, ISBN 1-904265-29-4)
- Tharg's Future Shocks:
  - "Space Dust" (colours, with Andrew Ness and art by Siku, in 2000 AD #1190, April 2000)
  - "The Petition" (script and art, in 2000 AD #1207, August 2000)
  - "Metamorphic Invaders!" (script and art, in 2000 AD #1229, 2001)
  - "The 29 Steps" (script and art, in 2000 AD #1231, 2001)
- Missionary Man: "Mark of the Beast" (colours, with Gordon Rennie and art by Jesus Redondo, in 2000 AD #1201–1204, July–August 2000)
- Roadkill (colours, with Dan Abnett and art by Richard Elson, in 2000 AD #1208–1211, August–September 2000)
- Scarlet Traces (with Ian Edginton):
  - Scarlet Traces (in Judge Dredd Megazine #4.16–4.18, 2002, tpb, Dark Horse, 2003, ISBN 1-56971-940-3)
  - The Great Game (4 issue mini-series, Dark Horse, 2006, tpb, 104 pages, May 2007, ISBN 1-59307-717-3)
- XTNCT (with Paul Cornell, in Judge Dredd Megazine #209–214, 2003–2004, tpb, XTNCT: CM ND HV G F Y THNK YR HRD NGH!, 48 pages, hardcover, December 2006, ISBN 1-904265-69-3
- Leviathan (with Ian Edginton, tpb, hardback, November 2006, ISBN 1-904265-65-0) collects:
  - "Leviathan" (in 2000 AD #1351–1360, 2003)
  - "Chosen Son" (in 2000 AD Prog 2005, 2004)
  - "McLean's Last Case" (in 2000 AD #1465, 2005)
  - "Beyond the Blue Horizon" (in 2000 AD #1466, 2005)
- Kingdom of the Wicked (with Ian Edginton, graphic novel, Dark Horse, 2004, ISBN 1-59307-187-6)
- H.G. Wells' The War of the Worlds (with Ian Edginton, Dark Horse e-comic and graphic novel, 2006, ISBN 1-59307-474-3)
- Stickleback (with Ian Edginton):
  - England's Glory (tpb, 132 pages, August 2008, ISBN 1-905437-74-9) collects:
    - "Mother London" (in 2000 AD, Prog 2007 and #1518–1525, 2006–2007)
    - "England's Glory" (in 2000 AD, Prog 2008 and #1567–1577, 2007–2008)
  - "London's Burning" (in 2000 AD, Prog 2010 and #1666–1676, 2009–2010)
- Nevermore: "Murder in the Rue Morgue" (with Ian Edginton, graphic novel adaptation, Eye Classics, Self Made Hero, October 2007, ISBN 978-0-9552856-8-4)
- The Vort (with G. Powell, in 2000 AD #1589–1596, 2008)
- Low Life (with Rob Williams):
  - "Creation" (in 2000 AD #1624–1631, 2009)
  - "Hostile Takeover" (in 2000 AD #1700–1709, 2010)
  - "The Deal" (in 2000 AD #1750–1761, 2011)
  - "Saudade" (in 2000 AD #1805–1811, 2012)
- Ordinary (with Rob Williams in Judge Dredd Megazine #340-345)

== Awards ==
- 2008:
  - Won the Favourite Comics Artist: Inks Eagle Award
  - Nominated for the Favourite Colourist Eagle Award
