= Caroline Barry =

American actress

- Born: Colorado Springs, Colorado, U.S.
- Education: University of Colorado
- Occupations: Actress, writer
- Years active: 2012–present
- Known for: movie acting
- Website: carolinebarry.net

Caroline Barry is an American actress who lives in Los Angeles.

== Life and career ==
Caroline Barry was born and raised in Colorado Springs, Colorado. She graduated from the University of Colorado, where she studied acting. After graduation, Barry relocated to Los Angeles to pursue a career in acting.

Barry played the lead role of Nellie Bly in the biographical film 10 Days in a Madhouse (2015).

== Filmography ==
Film roles
Year	Title	Role	Notes
2012	The Hero's Journey	Hera	Short film
2012	Dialectic	Laura	Short film
2013	Good Dog	Sissy	Short film
2015	Ex-Napped	Alex	Short film; also writer
2015	10 Days in a Madhouse	Nellie Bly	
2016	Threnody	Dana	Short film
2016	Battleborn	Eva Streed	
2017	Fake the Joy	Jackie	

Television roles
Year	Title	Role	Notes
2017	Swarm	Allison	Television film
2019	Words & Actions	Claire Hurley	Episodes: "This Player Here...", "Man Delights Not Me, Nor Woman Neither"
