= Scarlet Traces =

Steampunk comic series by Ian Edginton and D'Israeli

- The cover of the hardcover
- Created by: Ian Edginton; D'Israeli

Publication information
- Publisher: Rebellion Developments; Dark Horse Comics
- Schedule: Monthly
Title(s)
Judge Dredd Megazine (vol 4) #16-18
- Formats: Original material for the series has been published as a strip in the comics anthology(s) Judge Dredd Megazine and a set of limited series.
- Genre: Alternate history, steampunk
- Publication date: October–December 2002; July–October 2006
- Number of issues: 3; 4

Creative team
- Writer(s): Ian Edginton
- Artist(s): D'Israeli
- Letterer(s): D'Israeli
- Colourist(s): D'Israeli
- Editor(s): Alan Barnes; David Land/Katie Moody

Reprints
- Collected editions
- Scarlet Traces: ISBN 1-56971-940-3
- The Great Game: ISBN 1-59307-717-3

Scarlet Traces is a Steampunk comic series written by Ian Edginton and illustrated by D'Israeli. It was originally published online before being serialised in 2002, in the British anthology Judge Dredd Megazine. A sequel, Scarlet Traces: The Great Game, followed in 2006.

Edginton and D'Israeli's 2006 adaptation of H.G. Wells' The War of the Worlds is effectively a prequel to Scarlet Traces, as key characters of Scarlet Traces can be glimpsed therein and the same designs for the Martians and their technology are used.

Further series appeared in 2000 AD between 2016 and 2025.

== Setting ==
Scarlet Traces is based on the premise that Britain was able to reverse engineer alien technology, abandoned after the abortive Martian invasion of The War of the Worlds, to establish economic and political dominance over the remainder of the world.

The artwork shows an imposition of futuristic devices on early 20th century society. In the first series, set in 1908, London cabbies and the Household Cavalry have swapped their horses for mechanical devices with spiderlike legs; homes are heated and lit by modified versions of the Martian heat ray; the pigeons of Trafalgar Square are thinned out by miniature Martian war machines. In the sequel, Britain of the late 1930s is recreated along fairly recognisable lines but with an additional layer of alien derived technology.

== Plot ==
=== Scarlet Traces ===
The story begins ten years after the abortive Martian invasion of Earth, with bodies being washed up on the banks of the river Thames. The bodies are all female and drained of blood, prompting a local drunk, whose dog discovers them, to think that a vampire is on the loose. Emerging from comfortable retirement in fashionable Bedford Square, Major Robert Autumn DSO and his trusty manservant Colour Sergeant Arthur Currie search for the culprits after being informed that Currie's niece is most likely one of the missing girls.

Autumn is represented as a classic Victorian hero: honourable, perceptive and brave but out of his depth in a new age of ruthless exploitation personified by the bullish, cynical government official Dr. Davenport Spry.

After following the investigation across England and Scotland the pair, now accompanied by the drunk from London, discover that a single Martian has survived the bacteria by turning its own war machine into a hermetic chamber. In return for its life - and human blood to sustain it, the alien dubbed "Humpty", has been assisting British scientists in mastering advanced Martian technical skills.

In the finale Spry reveals that Britain, having come to dominate Earth using its newly acquired technology, now intends to invade Mars. In an ensuing fight Currie is killed, and Autumn loses an arm. Spry kills the captive Martian which has now served its purpose, and contemptuously dismisses Autumn as a "dusty relic". Later, a crippled and alcoholic Autumn witnesses the departure of Britain's Stellar Expeditionary Force to Mars, amid general scenes of patriotic fervor.

=== Scarlet Traces: The Great Game ===
Thirty years after the events of Scarlet Traces, the counter-invasion of Mars is going badly, with the Martians successfully defending themselves using heat ray weapons against the invaders. Charlotte Hemming, an aristocratic young photojournalist, is saved by Robert Autumn from the thuggish agents of an increasingly repressive British Government - led by Spry, now Prime Minister. Autumn asks her to travel to Mars and investigate why out of the thousands of soldiers sent, only three hundred and seventy two have returned from the war. At the same time, the government is shown to be under pressure from a Nationalistic Scottish breakaway faction; plus Canada, Australia and New Zealand who wish to remove their troops from the space combat.

Hemming's spaceship is shot down as it enters Mars' atmosphere. She survives, but her cover is blown. She discovers that the Martians are not in fact native to Mars, but seem to have originated from a now-destroyed planet that became the asteroid belt. She theorises that a previous civilisation existed on Mars and was itself plunged into warfare by the arrival of the Asteroid "Martians", resulting in their extinction.

Hemming also discovers that the Martians have been using genetic techniques to mimic humanity to an indistinguishable degree - but the government is already aware of this, and has been preventing any substantial return of veterans to Earth, in case they are in fact disguised Martians.

Spry's government is about to deliver a coup de grace in some unknown form, and destroy all the remaining Martians - as well as an expendable rearguard left behind when the main body of the expeditionary force is secretly evacuated.

The expected doomsday weapon is delivered, and turns out to be modified Cavorite in capsule form, which sticks to anything it touches, and lifts it off the planet into the vacuum of space. Hemming is amongst those who survive, but they discover that humanoid Martians have taken control of the Lunar colony, and turned its mass driver into a weapon targeted on Earth. The bulk of the returning expeditionary force has been ambushed and destroyed.

Ultimately the Martians are defeated when a Commonwealth space fleet, originally intended to evacuate their own troops, arrives and with the surviving British ships engage the Martians in a crossfire.

Earth is saved, and the British government falls, with Spry being amongst those killed in the mass driver attacks which have devastated London and much of southern England. Some years later, a retired Hemming is approached by officials of the new government who are worried she will expose the truth, which has been repressed. She assures them that she has no intention of upsetting the status quo, and returns to her garden - which contains several Triffids.

A further sequel Scarlet Traces Volume 03, set in 1968, was published in March 2022.

== Allusions and cameo appearances ==
=== References within the story ===
In The Great Game, when Charlotte reaches the cavern with the glyphs, the original inhabitants of the Solar System are revealed to be:

- Mercury: Mercurians from Dan Dare
- Venus: A Treen and a Theron from Dan Dare.
- Earth: Silurians and Sea Devils from Doctor Who.
- The Moon: The Watcher from Marvel Comics and a Selenite from H.G. Wells' The First Men in the Moon.
- Mars: A Green Martian from Barsoom (a fictional version of Mars) and a hrossa, séroni, and pfifltriggi from Out of the Silent Planet by C.S. Lewis.
- Asteroid belt: The "Martian" invaders from The War of the Worlds.

In The Great Game issue 1, Carl Kolchak makes a cameo appearance. In issue 2, Autumn's bookshelf includes a work entitled The Perils of Andrea, a reference to Perelandra. Both references were made by D'Israeli. The fictional Hobbs End underground station is a reference to Quatermass and the Pit.

Captain Haddock, Tintin and Snowy (from The Adventures of Tintin) can be spotted on page 42. There is a cameo by Dan Dare and Digby.

=== References in other works by Edginton and D'Israeli ===
The War of the Worlds adaptation by Dark Horse Comics contains several references to Scarlet Traces. Autumn and Currie can be seen in a newspaper as having saved Emperor Menelik of Abyssinia from an assassin. Ned Penny can be seen on the Thunder Child. An Archie the dog look-alike appears in the ruins of London. An official figure supervising the removal of Martian tripods after the end of the war resembles a young Dr. Spry, while the two army sergeants awaiting his orders reappear as Coughly and Dravott in Scarlet Traces. The adaptation ends with the narrator reflecting that it may be possible for humans to spread throughout the solar system also. In Kingdom of the Wicked, also by Edginton and D'Israeli, the main character's wife is seen reading Scarlet Traces.

== Publication history ==
The original Scarlet Traces was conceived as a partially animated serial, intended for the now-defunct website Cool Beans World. In an interview for 2000AD Review, Edginton said "The Cool Beans version was to have been like a little movie in many ways. It had music, sound effects, zooms, pans and dissolves. There was even going to be some limited animation of the War Machines. A lot of the work was done and in the can when Cool Beans shut down production..."

The website ceased operation after only a fraction of the serial had been published. D'Israeli wrote in his blog:

...when Cool Beans folded, we had a comic which was only 75% complete and which was still owned by the defunct publisher... Having retrieved the property, Ian (Edginton) then managed to license our previously-unpublished comic to Rebellion's Judge Dredd Megazine as a reprint — thus giving us the funds to complete the story while retaining ownership.

D'Israeli reworked Scarlet Traces as a traditional comic book story. This version was serialised in 2002 in the British anthology Judge Dredd Megazine (vol 4) issues 16 to 18. In 2003 it was collected in its own 4-issue limited series (with minor revisions) by US publisher Dark Horse Comics, and subsequently collected into one hardcover volume by Dark Horse Comics in August 2003 (ISBN 1-56971-940-3).

The Great Game was first published in a four-issue mini-series by Dark Horse Comics in 2006. The War of the Worlds was published in the same year. Cold War appeared in 2000 AD #1988–1999 in 2016.

=== Bibliography ===
- Scarlet Traces (in Judge Dredd Megazine (vol 4) #16-18, 2002)
- H. G. Wells's War of the Worlds (in a trade paperback, Dark Horse, 2006, ISBN 1-59307-474-3)
- The Great Game (in a trade paperback, Dark Horse, May 2007, ISBN 1-59307-717-3)
- Cold War (in 2000 AD #1988–1999, 2016)
- Cold War Book 2 (in 2000 AD #2023–2034, 2017)
- Home Front (in 2000 AD #2126–2129 and 2131–2138, 2019)
- Storm Front (in 2000 AD #2250–2255 and 2257–2261, 2021))
- Empire of Blood (in 2000 AD #2432–2449, 2025)

=== Collected editions ===
==== Dark Horse ====
- H. G. Wells's War of the Worlds, Dark Horse, 2006, ISBN 1-59307-474-3
- Scarlet Traces, Dark Horse, 2003, ISBN 1-56971-940-3
- The Great Game, Dark Horse, 104 pages, May 2007, ISBN 1-59307-717-3

==== Rebellion ====
- Scarlet Traces: Volume One, 140 pages, Rebellion Publishing, 2017, ISBN 9781781085028

- Includes War of the Worlds and Scarlet Traces

- This also came as an exclusive-to-webstore limited edition, which included a numbered bookplate, signed by both the artist and writer, and an exclusive B&W original print by D'Israeli

- Scarlet Traces: Volume Two, Rebellion Publishing, 2017, ISBN 9781781085615

- Includes The Great Game, Cold War and Cold War Book 2

- Scarlet Traces: Volume Three, 128 pages, Rebellion Publishing, 2022, ISBN 9781781089439

- Includes Home Front and Storm Front

- Scarlet Traces: Volume Four, 112 pages, Rebellion Publishing, 2026, ISBN 9781837867868

- Includes Empire of Blood

== Awards ==
- 2007 nominated for the Eisner Awards for:
  - Best Limited Series, The Great Game
  - Best Writer, Ian Edginton, for his work on The Great Game

== See also ==
- Edison's Conquest of Mars, one of the earliest sequels to War of the Worlds
- Sherlock Holmes's War of the Worlds, another unofficial sequel
- The League of Extraordinary Gentlemen, Volume II, also featuring the Martian invasion
- War of the Worlds: Second Wave, a comic book by Michael Alan Nelson and Chee for Boom! Studios, in which bacteria-resistant Martians return.
- "The Queen of Night's Aria", a short story sequel to The War of the Worlds by Ian McDonald, published in the 2013 George R. R. Martin and Gardner Dozois anthology Old Mars, depicts a setting very similar to Scarlet Traces: The Great Game.
- The Massacre of Mankind, 2017 novel by Stephen Baxter that is a sequel to The War of the Worlds
- List of steampunk works
