= The 1 Up Fever =

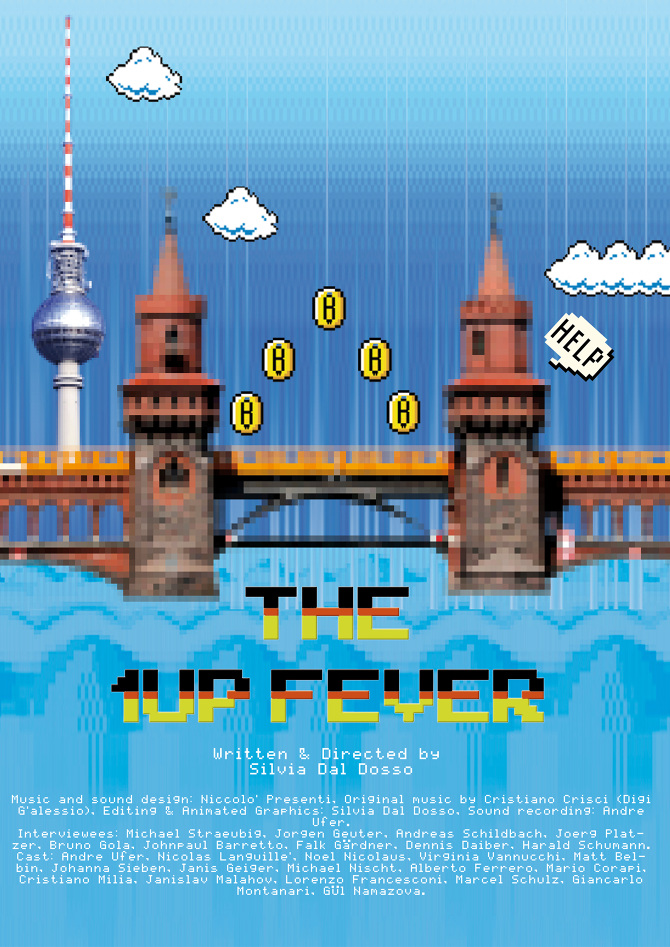
- Film poster
- Directed by: Silvia Dal Dosso
- Music by: Clap! Clap!, Niccolò Presenti
- Release date: August 2, 2013
- Running time: 14 minutes
- Country: Germany

The 1 Up Fever is a 2013 mockumentary about the first usage of the Bitcoin cryptocurrency and the release of an augmented reality smartphone-based video game inspired by the Super Mario Bros. platform game. The movie was shot in the city of Berlin and after its web release on August 2, 2013, it became a small case among the Bitcoin community and between augmented reality video game developers.

The documentary had its European Premiere at Cineglobe Film Festival du CERN, now Geneva International Film Festival Tous Ecrans, where it won the Audience Favourite Documentary prize and its North American premiere at the Silicon Valley Science Fiction Short Film Festival. The movie was also named and shown as a nominee in many other film festivals.

== Overview ==
The short movie describes the possible aftermaths due to the release of an augmented reality game, which awards its users with Bitcoin prizes. The game is an action game inspired by Nintendo's Super Mario Bros. platform game, transposed to an augmented reality environment. The actors walk through the city, jumping, climbing, grasping yellow coins with their phones, obsessed by the gold fever. The Berlin city is the stage of this strange behaviour, while the gamers discover new ways of living the city landscape and its socio-economic texture. The game has been seen as an allegorization of the gold farming and microlabor mechanisms of Bitcoin mining.

Part of the work is dedicated to the "Bitcoin kiez", a district of Berlin Kreuzberg which aroused the interest of the media for being the place with the highest density of businesses accepting the Bitcoin currency in the world. The story is a consideration of the huge impact that the usage of smartphones on a great scale and the rising business of the big data market and data mining can have on the private life and habits of the users, as local Bitcoin developers, journalists and hackers discuss about the secret identity of the game developer, which winks at the mysterious figure of the Bitcoin designer Satoshi Nakamoto, and about the financial reasons which lay behind the release of the game app.

== Release ==
During the weeks after its release, The 1 Up Fever received critical praise, and many started searching for how to download the game app, until the author revealed the Mockery. In 2017 The 1 Up Fever was on the news again, to have been allegedly inspired the Pokemon Challenge's April 1 Mockery of 2014, and the consequent creation of the Pokémon GO App.
