= Timothy Hines =

American film producer

Timothy Hines is an American film director, writer and producer. Best known for his adaptation of the H. G. Wells novel The War of the Worlds, he has a background in directing television commercials and short films. In 1999, he founded the independent film production company Pendragon Pictures with his colleague Susan Goforth. To date, they have produced three films together H.G. Wells' The War of the Worlds (2005), War of the Worlds – The True Story (2011) and 10 Days in a Madhouse (2015)

== Filmography ==
=== Writer & director ===
- The Edison Device (1985)
- Sunrise on Alphabet City (1989)
- House of the Rising (1994)
- A Midsummer Night's Dream (1998)
- Bug Wars (2000)
- H.G. Wells' The War of the Worlds (2005)
- War of the Worlds – The True Story (2012)
- 10 Days in a Madhouse (2015)
- Tomorrow's Today (2021)
- The Wilde Girls (2025)
