= Kingdom of the Wicked =

Comic book series written by Ian Edginton

- Cover of Kingdom of the Wicked, trade paperback collected edition, art by D'Israeli.

Publication information
- Publisher: Caliber Comics; Dark Horse Comics
- Format: Limited series
- Genre: Dark fantasy
- Publication date: August 1996 – March 1997
- No. of issues: 4

Creative team
- Written by: Ian Edginton
- Artist(s): D'Israeli
- Letterer(s): Woodrow Phoenix
- Colorist(s): D'Israeli (Dark Horse volumes)
- Editor(s): James Pruett; Joe Pruett

Collected editions
- Hardcover: ISBN 1-59307-187-6

Kingdom of the Wicked is a comic book series written by Ian Edginton and illustrated by D'Israeli. It was published as a mini-series in 1996 and collected into a hardcover volume in 2004.

== Publication history ==
Kingdom of the Wicked was originally published as black and white comics in the mid-1990s by Caliber Comics.

After Dark Horse Comics published Edginton and D'Israeli's Scarlet Traces in 2002, they released an updated version of Kingdom of the Wicked on December 1, 2004. The new version was collected as a hardcover, colored, included a new eight-page prologue and extra story at the end, and was revised to include references to contemporary children's fantasy, such as J. K. Rowling and Lemony Snicket.

== Plot ==
Kingdom of the Wicked focuses on Christopher Grahame. As a young child he was bedridden and to amuse himself began writing stories centered around an elaborate fantasy world named Castrovalva. As he grew older, he eventually abandoned Castrovalva and its population of made-up friends. The new prologue shows how, after Chris left, a monster in the shape of a boy arrived to begin terrorizing the populace. After marrying and having his first child, Chris began to write stories again to amuse his daughter. His wife collected them and, without his knowledge, sent them in to be published. Now, several years later, he is known as the greatest children's writer in the world, besieged by offers of movie rights, sequels, art galleries, and the like.

At a press event, Chris begins having a series of blackouts, finding himself back in the world of Castrovalva. However, Castrovalva is now a war-torn landscape, where his childhood friends are fighting a war similar to World War I against a figure known as "the Great Dictator". The Great Dictator was the monster-child from the prologue, the "spitting image" of Chris. Chris sees his friend, teddy bear Sergeant Fuzzbox, get killed by going over the top and another friend, tin soldier Captain (now Colonel) Flashheart be murdered by an agent of the Great Dictator.

In the real world, Chris' wife and his doctors realize the reason he has been having the blackouts is due to a parasitic twin that failed to develop in pregnancy, and has attached itself to Chris' central nervous system. In Castrovalva, Chris has been manipulated into entering the Land Under the Bed that serves as the Great Dictator's headquarters, where the Great Dictator explains much the same thing. He was only able to look out at the world from Chris' senses, being otherwise incapable of anything. When Chris abandoned Castrovalva, the Dictator moved in, finding it a fully made world that he would actually be able to inhabit and live in. However, after tiring of toying with its imaginary inhabitants, he lured Chris back in through the blackouts in order to kill him and possess his real brain, therefore becoming the "real" Chris.

Chris manages to stop the Dictator's attempts by realizing that Castrovalva is his territory, and that he can make the rules there. At the same time in the real world, Chris undergoes surgery to remove the fetus from his skull, but Chris takes pity on the Dictator, and absorbs his essence into his. A brief afterword states that Chris took nine months to regain consciousness, and never told anyone of the events, but the final page shows him working on a script entitled "Kingdom of the Wicked", implying his next book will be based on what he saw, and the final panel shows Chris and the Dictator, both as small boys again, running through a restored Castrovalva to play with Fuzzbox, Flashheart, and the other friends who died in the war.

== Collected editions ==
The mini-series, along with "Kingdom of the Wicked: Little Monsters" from Negative Burn #38, have been collected into two volumes:

- Softcover (Caliber, softcover, 1997, ISBN 0-941613-97-6)
- Hardcover (Dark Horse, 120 pages, 2004, ISBN 1-59307-187-6)
