= Transilvania International Film Festival =

International feature film festival in Romania

- Opening film: Christy by Brendan Canty
- Closing film: Sirāt by Oliver Laxe
- Location: Cluj-Napoca, Romania
- Founded: 2002
- Most recent: 2025
- Awards: Transylvania Trophy
- Hosted by: Romanian Film Promotion
- Festival date: 13 June – 22 June 2025
- Website: tiff.ro

Current: 24th
- 25th 23rd

The Transilvania International Film Festival (TIFF; Romanian: Festivalul internațional de film Transilvania) is the first international feature film festival in Romania, which is held annually in the historic capital of Transylvania, Cluj-Napoca. Founded in 2002 by the Romanian Film Promotion (Romanian: Asociația pentru Promovarea Filmului Românesc), TIFF has grown rapidly to become the most important film-related event in Romania. It is a member of the Alliance of Central and Eastern European Film Festivals (CentEast) and it is supported by the Creative Europe – MEDIA Programme. In February 2011, TIFF has been accredited by the FIAPF as a "competitive festival specialised on first and second feature films". Indiewire listed it as one of the world's top 50 leading film festivals.

The festival takes place in 20 locations around the city, including outdoor and unconventional places. Since 2007 the festival is also held in Sibiu. It is the year when Sibiu was declared European Capital of Culture. Transilvania IFF's main goal is the promotion of cinematic art by presenting some of the most innovative and spectacular films of the moment that feature both originality and independence of expression, that reflect unusual cinematic language forms or focus on current trends in youth culture. The competition is dedicated to first and second feature films.

Since 2018 the festival is also held in Oradea.

The festival also developed an educational platform for children, through EducaTIFF (awarded Best Educational Project in Romania, at Education Awards Gala, 2011 edition), and teenagers, through Let's Go Digital! The intensive workshop gives teenagers the opportunity to cover all the steps of filmmaking under the supervision of film professionals and using modern equipment.

After years of continuous work in promoting Romanian cinema and welcoming international guests to meet national productions and their filmmakers, in 2015, the festival rounded up its industry activities under one umbrella. TIFF – Industry is open for talents from Romania and Moldova and is gathering Transilvania Talent Lab (TTL) – the hands-on programme dedicated to emerging talents, and Transilvania Pitch Stop (TPS) – a tailor-made workshop for feature fiction films wrapping up with a public presentation and one-to-one meetings. TIFF – Industry hosts a series of masterclasses, lining-up experts in audience development, and script writing, film directors, documentarist and personalities. TIFF Industry also means closed screenings for industry members and special screenings of the newest Romanian films, in the presence of their filmmakers.

== History ==
TIFF is the first film festival in Romania with an international feature film competition. The 2007 festival made use of the character Count Dracula for promotional materials, along with a mascot resembling Count Orlok from the Dracula-inspired 1922 film Nosferatu, followed by a screening of the classic film.

In 2016, TIFF attracted more than 120,000 attendees.

== Awards ==
- Transilvania Trophy;
- Best Directing Award;
- Special Jury Award;
- Best Performance Award;
- Special mention of the jury;
- FIPRESCI Award;
- Audience Award;
- Excellency Award;
- Lifetime Achievement Award;
- Romanian Days Award for Feature Film;
- Romanian Days Award for Short Film;
- Romanian Days Award for Best Debut;
- Award for the Best Film in the Shadows Shorts Competition;
- Special Mention of the Short Film Jury in the Romanian Days;
- Let's Go Digital! Award for the Best Film Produced in the LGD! Workshop;
- Transilvania Pitch Stop Development Award;
- Transilvania Pitch Stop Post Production Award;
- Local Competition Award;
- Special Mention at the Local Competition;
- Young Francophone Jury Prize.

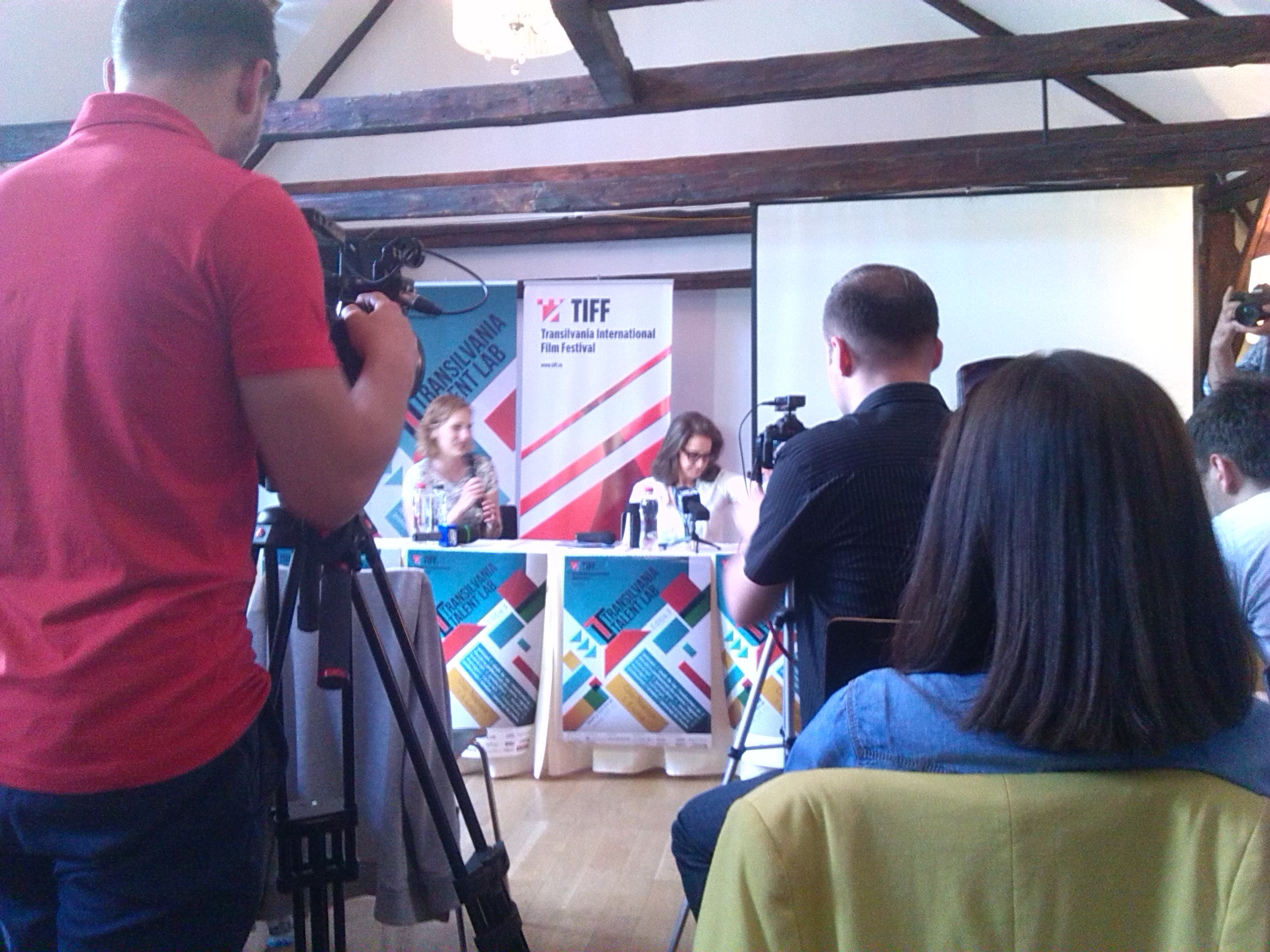
Debra Winger (right) at Transilvania International Film Festival 2014

Over the years, Transilvania IFF's Lifetime Achievement Award has been presented to important figures of European and worldwide cinema, including Sophia Loren Nastassja Kinski, Jiří Menzel, Debra Winger, Claude Lelouch, Geraldine Chaplin, Wim Wenders, Marin Karmitz, Jacqueline Bisset, Michael York, Catherine Deneuve, Claudia Cardinale, Annie Girardot, Udo Kier, Vanessa Redgrave, Nicolas Roeg and Franco Nero.

=== Transilvania Trophy recipients ===
Year	Film	Director	Country
2024	Girls Will Be Girls	Shuchi Talati	India
2023	Like a Fish on the Moon	Dornaz Hajiha	Iran
2022	Utama	Alejandro Loayza Grisi	Bolivia
2021	The Whaler Boy	Philipp Yuryev	Russia
2020	Babyteeth	Shannon Murphy	Australia
2019	MONOS	Alejandro Landes	Colombia
2018	Las herederas	Marcelo Martinessi	Paraguay
2017	Chemi Bednieri Ojakhi	Nana Ekvtimishvili, Simon Groß	Georgia
2016	Câini	Bogdan Mirică	Romania
2015	El incendio	Juan Schnitman	Argentina
2014	Stockholm	Rodrigo Sorogoyen	Spain
2013	Ship of Theseus	Anand Gandhi	India/Netherlands
2012	Oslo, 31. august	Joachim Trier	Norway
2011	Sin retorno	Miguel Cohan	Spain/Argentina
2010	Jao nok krajok	Anocha Suwichakornpong	Thailand
2009	Nord	Rune Denstad Langlo	Norway
2009	Polițist, adjectiv	Corneliu Porumboiu	Romania
2008	Intimidades de Shakespeare y Víctor Hugo	Yulene Olaizola	Mexico
2007	La sagrada familia	Sebastián Lelio	Chile
2006	A fost sau n-a fost?	Corneliu Porumboiu	Romania
2005	4	Ilya Khrzhanovsky	Russia/Netherlands
2005	Whisky	Juan Pablo Rebella, Pablo Stoll	Uruguay/Argentina/Germany/Spain
2004	Días de Santiago	Josué Méndez	Peru
2003	Nói albinói	Dagur Kári	Iceland/Germany/UK/Denmark
2002	Occident	Cristian Mungiu	Romania

=== Best Romanian Feature Film (Romanian Days) winners and nominees ===
- 2024 winner: Dismissed
  - 2024 nominees: Alice On & Off, A Cautionary Tale, Dismissed, Ext. Car. Night, Family Weekend, Holy Week, Horia, Maia - Portrait with Hands, Night Butterflies, Rusalka, Three Kilometers to the End of the World, Where Elephants Go
- 2023 winner: Between Revolutions
- 2022 winner: Miracle
- 2021 winner: Otto the Barbarian
- 2020 winner: Acasa, My Home
- 2019 winner: Monsters.
- 2018 winner: Pororoca
- 2017 winner: Scarred Hearts
- 2016 winner: The Last Day
- 2015 winner: The Treasure
  - 2015 nominees: Be My Cat: A Film for Anne, Bondoc, Bucharest NonStop, Passport to Germany, Self-Portrait of a Dutiful Daughter, Toto and His Sisters, The Treasure, The World Is Mine

== See also ==
- Comedy Cluj
- Gay Film Nights
