= Worlds at War =

1989 video game

- Developer: Intercine
- Publishers: Lyric Software; RAW Entertainment
- Platforms: Amiga, MS-DOS
- Release: 1989
- Genre: Turn-based strategy

Worlds at War is a turn-based strategy game published in 1989 by Lyric Software. It was republished in 1991 by RAW Entertainment.

== Gameplay ==
Worlds at War is a game in which the player and an opponent conquer the planets of a region in space.

== Reception ==
Bob Proctor reviewed the game for Computer Gaming World, and stated that "Worlds At War (WAW) is not spectacular but is well done and workable. The concept isn't novel but it works."

== Reviews ==
- Amiga World
