= Rob De Mezieres =

South African writer and director

- Citizenship: South Africa
- Occupations: Writer and film director
- Notable work: mockumentary

Rob De Mezieres is a South African writer and director. His first film, mockumentary Shooting Bokkie won first prize at the Festival Africano di Milano, and Best South African Feature Film at the 24th Durban International Film Festival in 2003.

== Films ==
=== Shooting Bokkie ===
Directed by: Rob de Mezieres, Adam Rist
Writing credits: Rob de Mezieres, John Fredericks
Produced by: Andrew Cassells
Movie Genre: Drama, Documentary
Released: 2003
Running Time: 74 minutes
Rating: 18VL

Synopsis A South African filmmaker convinces a film crew to help him make a documentary about a 13-year-old assassin in the South African Cape Flats. Following the 13-year-old hitman (a bokkie) as he goes about his daily business, the audience gains unique insight into the lives of people living on the Cape Flats, living under conditions of poverty and violence, and the gangster culture that is prevalent there.

The mockumentary format of the film invites us to consider the ethics of filmmaking in a culture of violence. As Van der Vliet (2007) points out, it also calls into question the ethics that attend being an observer to violence.

This thought provoking film won first prize at the Festival Africano di Milano, and Best South African Feature Film at the 24th Durban International Film Festival Awards in 2003.

Shooting Bokkie was originally released as an impactful short film.
The Short won a Gold Award at the 1999 South African National Film and Video Association Awards.

The documentary was shot on minimal budget (largely privately raised), and took five years to make. The difficulty De Mezieres and Rist encountered in raising a budget for this film, together with examples like Timothy Greene's innovative solution to funding problems in the making of Boy called Twist, illustrate some of the challenges that face South African filmmakers in getting movies into production.

The short version of Shooting Bokkie can be viewed at ]

== Filmography ==
2007 Editor Prey - The Making of
2004 Editor 'Home'
2003 Writer-Director-Editor Shooting Bokkie (The Feature)
2001 Director-Editor Fudukazi's Magic
2000 Editor Taming the Tugela
1999 Writer-Director-Editor Shooting Bokkie The Short
1993 Editor-Director Raptures of The Deep (Gold Award, UNESCA)
