= H. G. Wells' The War of the Worlds (comics) =

H.G. Wells' The War of the Worlds

Publication information
- Publisher: Dark Horse Comics
- Format: Graphic novel
- Genre: Science Fiction
- Publication date: 2006

Creative team
- Created by: Ian Edginton (writer), D'Israeli (illustrator)

H.G. Wells' The War of the Worlds is a 2006 comic adaptation of H. G. Wells' 1898 novel The War of the Worlds, written by Ian Edginton and illustrated by D'Israeli.

== Production ==
Edginton and D'Israeli had previously worked together to create the comic Scarlet Traces, their comic book sequel to the original The War or the Worlds. Several characters from Scarlet Traces can be seen in this series, and it reuses their designs of the Martians and their machines.

The comic was released as a webcomic on the Dark Horse Comics website and was published as a graphic novel in 2006 by Dark Horse Comics (72 pages, ISBN 1-59307-474-3).

== Reception ==
According to Dark Horse, War of the Worlds was reviewed by Comics Buyer's Guide, who said: "Ian Edgington and D'Israeli have taken the high road and interpreted Wars as a late-1800s tale. Scientists still get front-page news and are seen with respect. There is no electricity in common use. Weapons? The mighty cannon, of course. And we can't forget bacteria, either. Art-wise, it is a good job, complete with devastating scenes of destruction, raging Victorian citizens, and a pock-faced hero who lives to see the day of deliverance. All in all, it's a good adaptation of a novel that will always be a classic."

== Legal disputes ==
In July 2006, Pendragon Pictures gave legal notice to Dark Horse Comics, claiming that the comic directly replicated hundreds of images from its 2005 film H. G. Wells' The War of the Worlds. Pendragon set up a website that compared frames of the movie to panels from the comic, and included a poll for the public to vote on whether they thought the images were similar. By April 2008, Pendragon had posted on its website that "[it] now agrees that it has no evidence at this time that Dark Horse misappropriated or copied any image, concept or theme from Pendragon's movie. Pendragon Pictures regrets and apologizes to Dark Horse for any misconception its press release or later internet poll may have caused."

== See also ==
- Scarlet Traces, Edgington and D'Israeli's sequel to War of the Worlds
- The League of Extraordinary Gentlemen, Volume II, another comic series by Alan Moore and Kevin O'Neill which also uses the War of the Worlds setting
- List of steampunk works
- List of comics based on fiction
