= The War of the Worlds (Gold Rush Games) =

The War of the Worlds is a 2003 role-playing game supplement published by Gold Rush Games.

== Contents ==
The War of the Worlds is a supplement in which the Martian invasion is presented as a full campaign of human survival against extraterrestrial foes.

== Reviews ==
- Backstab #47
- Realms of Fantasy
