= Incarnate (disambiguation) =

Incarnation is a religious concept similar to divine embodiment and manifestation.

Incarnate may also refer to:

- Incarnate (Dungeons & Dragons), the role-playing game character class
- Incarnate (The Obsessed album), an album by The Obsessed
- Incarnate (Killswitch Engage album), an album by Killswitch Engage
- Incarnate (comics), a comic book mini-series
- Incarnate (film), a 2016 horror film
- University of the Incarnate Word, a private Catholic university
- Incarnate, a book by Ramsey Campbell
- Rise of Incarnates, a fighting video game by Bandai Namco Games

== See also ==
- Incarnation (disambiguation)
- Incarnations (disambiguation)
