= Radical Studios =

American multimedia studio

- Type: Private multimedia studio
- Industry: Film and publishing
- Founded: 2007
- Founders: Jesse Berger; Barry Levine
- Headquarters: Los Angeles, California
- Products: Film and comics
- Parent: Blatant Entertainment, Inc.
- Divisions: Radical Publishing; Radical Pictures; Radical Comics; Radical Interactive; Radical Family
- Website: radicalstudios.com

Radical Studios is an American multimedia studio headquartered in Los Angeles, California. It produces feature films, television, physical and digital publishing, merchandise, recorded music, digital and online media applications and mobile and social games.

== History ==
Radical Publishing was founded in 2007 by Barry Levine, David Elliott, Jesse Berger, and Matthew Berger.

The company launched its first titles, Hercules: The Thracian Wars and Caliber: First Canon of Justice, in May 2008. The company was awarded the 2008 Diamond Gem Award for New Comic Book Publisher of the Year from Diamond Comic Distributors for its first two titles, which enjoyed sellout releases.

In May 2009 Elliott was replaced by new Editor-in-Chief David Wohl. In September 2010, the company rebranded itself as Radical Studios.

In 2011, the company reduced its overall staff. In January, 2012 David Wohl announced that he was leaving the company. Shortly after, the company removed their title Under the Faerie Moon from Free Comic Book Day and cancelled the release of Damaged issue 6.

In March 2012, the company began production on the movie Oblivion with Universal Pictures, based on an unpublished book created by director Joseph Kosinski, starring Tom Cruise, Morgan Freeman, Andrea Riseborough, Olga Kurylenko and Melissa Leo. The film opened #1 at the box office on April 19, 2013, generating $38.5 million in its US opening weekend. The film went on to generate $89 million in the US box office and $198 million internationally, for a global cumulative gross of $287 million.

In February 2013, the company raised $3m in equity from Los Angeles-based production company Wolfiskin Productions, to help expand its digital strategy and licensing capabilities.

In June 2013, the company started production on Hercules, with MGM and Paramount Pictures, starring Dwayne "The Rock" Johnson, based on the Radical Comics' series Hercules: The Thracian Wars. The movie opened at #2 in the box office on July 25, 2014, generating $29.8M in its US opening weekend. The film went on to generate $72 million in the US box office and $170 million internationally, for a global cume of $243 million.

In November 2018, the company started production on The Last Days of American Crime with Netflix and Mandalay Pictures, starring Édgar Ramírez, Anna Brewster, Michael Pitt, and Sharlto Copley, based on the Radical Comics' series created by Rick Remender. The film was directed by Olivier Megaton, based on a screenplay written by Karl Gajdusek, and produced by Jesse Berger through Radical Studios, Jason Michael Berman through Mandalay Pictures, Barry Levine and Kevin Turen. The Last Days of American Crime was released digitally by Netflix on June 5, 2020. It was the top-watched film on Netflix in its first weekend.

== Film ==
Stemming from its start as a comic book publisher, and in regards to its comics, Radical founder Barry Levine stated that "each title is built with the assumption the comic book will eventually land on the big screen." These tools are used to attract film directors and other talent for attachment to a project during the development process. Lastly, Radical sometimes employs the comic's series writer to draft an initial screenplay of their work as a part of the film pitch package presented to studios. Using these strategies, Radical has attracted various Hollywood talent and studios to their projects.

Film director Darren Bousman at SDCC 2009 with Radical Comics

=== Released films ===
- Oblivion (2013): Director Joseph Kosinski (Tron: Legacy) brought this original concept to Radical and is now a major motion picture co-written and directed by Kosinski, and produced and released by Universal Pictures, based on the never published illustrated novel. It stars Tom Cruise, Olga Kurylenko, Andrea Riseborough, Morgan Freeman, Melissa Leo, Zoë Bell, and Nikolaj Coster-Waldau. Regarding the status of the never released illustrated novel, Kosinski told Empire Magazine "I don't have any plans to do it right now. To me it's feels like it's in the rear-view mirror, you know? It's like part of the development process. The film is the end result. But never say never. Maybe at some point it will be fun to go back and show the steps and the journey."
- Hercules (2014): Director Brett Ratner is attached to produce and direct. A co-production of Radical Studios, MGM and Paramount Pictures. The script is written by Evan Spiliotopoulos and Ryan Condal based upon the comic series created by Radical Publishing and written by Steve Moore. The lead role has been cast with Dwayne "The Rock" Johnson. Aksel Hennie is cast in the role of Tydeus. Rufus Sewell is cast as Autolycus. Ian McShane has been cast as Amphiarus, part priest, part prophet and part warrior who is Hercules' counselor. Also joining are Joseph Fiennes, John Hurt and Rebecca Ferguson.
- Abattoir (2016): Darren Lynn Bousman is attached to write and direct a film based on the 6-issue miniseries).
- The Last Days of American Crime (2020): In 2009, Sam Worthington was originally attached to produce and star in The Last Days of American Crime. In 2013 it was announced that Worthington was no longer involved with the project. The film was ultimately made with Édgar Ramírez in the lead role and directed by Olivier Megaton.

=== Films in development ===
- Freedom Formula: Ghost of the Wasteland: Bryan Singer has been attached to direct, with production through Singer's Bad Hat Harry Productions. The rights to the film adaptation are licensed to New Regency Productions.
- Shrapnel: Len Wiseman (Underworld) has been attached to direct and produce a film adaptation, but dropped out. Hilary Swank will star and produce the movie with Sean Daniel and Radical Pictures from a script by Toby Wagstaff.
- Damaged: Sam Worthington and John Schwarz will star in the film adaptation with Worthington producing.

== Publishing ==
Radical Comics logo

The company launched its first comic titles, Hercules and Caliber, in May 2008 as 5-issue mini-series and debuted as the #7 comic book company in North American comic book shops in market share based on a monthly report by ICV2. Rather than the superheroes typical of Marvel and DC Comics, Radical's titles focus on retellings of iconic fictional characters, mythology, science fiction, fantasy, horror, historical fiction, supernatural themes, and genre-based crime. Radical releases comics first as miniseries, and then combines these miniseries into paperback collections. Radical's strategy in the comic book business is to create properties that feature painted art and "great stories that will appeal to the fans and the marketplace as a whole." Many of Radical's titles are published in a larger 48-page form, rather than the industry standard 22-page format. Radical comics are distributed in both mass market stores and specialized comic book shops. by Diamond Comic Distributors of North America. At one point Radical had a distribution deal for mass market stores in the United States and Canada by Random House. However, the company rejoined Diamond Comic Distributors in 2011. As of 2012, Radical has published 20 different titles and is currently distributed by Diamond Comic Distributors. Currently, Radical has not released any new comics or graphic novels since the release of Damaged issue 5 on February 1, 2012. The final issue of Damaged has since been cancelled.

The company has released a number of titles:

- Hercules (by Steve Moore):
  - The Thracian Wars, a 5-issue limited series
  - The Knives of Kush, a 5-issue limited series, with Cris Bolsin
- Caliber
- City of Dust by Steve Niles, Zid and Brandon Chng
- Shrapnel by Mark Long, Nick Sagan, M. Zachary Sherman and Bagus Hutomo
- Hotwire: Requiem for the Dead by Warren Ellis and Steve Pugh
- FVZA: The Federal Vampire and Zombie Agency by David Hine
- Incarnate by Nick Simmons
- Legends: The Enchanted by Nick Percival.
- Aladdin: Legacy of the Lost by Dave Elliott, Ian Edginton, Patrick Reilly and Stjepan Sejic
- The Last Days of American Crime by Rick Remender and Greg Tocchini
- After Dark created by Antoine Fuqua & Wesley Snipes, written by Peter Milligan and illustrated by Jeff Netrup

=== Reprints ===
They also used to collect and reprint works previously published elsewhere:

- Cholly and Flytrap by Arthur Suydam
- The Lords of Misrule by John Tomlinson, Dan Abnett, Steve White, Gary Erskine and Peter Snejbjerg, recoloured by J. M. Ringuet

== Awards ==
Radical received the 2008 Diamond Gem Award for New Comic Book Publisher of the Year from Diamond Comic Distributors. Diamond Comic Distributors is recognized as the premier comic book distributor in North America. The awards are voted on by the comic book store retailers, and are based on the overall impact of the publisher on the industry, taking into account sales performance, quality and creativity.

Legends: The Enchanted won the HorrorNews Net award for Best Original Graphic Novel 2010.

Legends: The Enchanted was nominated for an Eagle Award for Favourite Single Story 2010.

== Legal ==
In July 2009, it was reported that Elliott had filed a lawsuit against Radical Publishing's parent company, Blatant Entertainment. The lawsuit cited disagreements over unpaid wages, as well as contract and copyright disputes as reasoning behind the action.

In early 2010, Radical Publishing had to halt publication of Nick Simmons' series Incarnate following accusations of plagiarism.
