= Nick Percival =

British graphic artist and graphic novelist

- Areas: Writer, Penciller, Artist, Inker, Colorist

Nick Percival is a British graphic artist and graphic novelist primarily known for his published comic book, concept artwork and career in computer animation directing.

== Biography ==
Percival's first published work was in the monthly British comic Judge Dredd Megazine with a horror 'strange cases' tale written by Dave Stone. After several similar stories in the Megazine, he then went on to paint a nine-part story set in Judge Dredd's world in the Cursed Earth with the series Sleeze 'n' Ryder, where Nick worked with acclaimed writer Garth Ennis.

The pair would later work together again for the British weekly comic 2000 AD on the Judge Dredd epic "Goodnight Kiss", another tale set in the radioactive wasteland of the Cursed Earth, where Judge Dredd is hunted by the assassin Jonni Kiss and the mutant Brotherhood of Marshalls.

Percival also painted the Sláine story "King of Hearts" for 2000 AD, where he worked with the co-creator of 2000 AD, Pat Mills.

Aside from his 2000 AD work on various stories and painted covers, including the Dredd story, "Crime Prevention" with acclaimed comic book author Mark Millar, Percival has also produced work for Marvel Comics, Image Comics, MTV, Wizards of the Coast, Upper Deck Entertainment, Boom! Studios, IDW Publishing, Electronic Arts, Sony, Warner Bros., Activision, Atari, Sci Fi Channel, History Channel, Microsoft, and Fantasy Flight Games.

He also became prolific in the video game and animation industries where he ran an animation studio in the UK. He directed computer generated cut-scenes for video game such as Men in Black II: Alien Escape, Z: Steel Soldiers, Carmageddon TDR 2000, and the Games Workshop licensed video game of Gorkamorka. His company also developed their own computer generated short films and Percival presented one of these successfully at the Cartoon Movie Festival 2002 in Berlin.

Percival is the author and illustrator of Legends: The Enchanted, an original graphic novel, to be adapted into a feature film by Ron Howard's Imagine Entertainment. Legends: The Enchanted won the HorrorNews Net award for Best Original Graphic Novel 2010. and was nominated for an Eagle Award for Favourite Single Story 2010.

In 2015, Percival won the 13th Annual Rondo Hatton Classic Horror Award for Best Cover Art for his painted Nightbreed cover for Fangoria magazine.

Percival's poster artwork for the independent horror film Female Werewolf won the Fantastic Cinema Excellence in Poster Design Award 2016.

In 2017, he won the Horror News Network's Comic Award for Best Cover Artwork of 2017 for the comic book Hook Jaw.

More recently, Percival has been painting the continuing saga of Judge Dredd's most famous nemesis, Judge Death and the Dark Judges, with the Dark Justice: Dominion and The Torture Garden series.

Percival has since completed four series in the Dark Judges saga for 2000AD and continues to illustrate Judge Dredd, focusing on the horror side of Dredd's world.

In 2024, he won the 'Favourite Judge Dredd Cover' of the year in the official 2000AD Reader's Poll.

== Bibliography ==
=== Comics ===
Interior comics artwork includes:

- Strange Cases:
  - "Monsters" (with writer Dave Stone, in Judge Dredd Megazine vol. 1 #18, 1992)
  - "The Great Outdoors" (with writer Nicholas Barber, in Judge Dredd Megazine vol. 1 #19, 1992)
  - "Where the Heart is!" (with writer Nicholas Barber, in Judge Dredd Mega Special, 1992)
- Sleeze 'n' Ryder (with writer Garth Ennis, in Judge Dredd Megazine vol. 2 #19-26, 1993)
- Brit-Cit Brute (with writer Robbie Morrison):
  - "Brit-Cit Brute" (in Judge Dredd Megazine vol. 2 #31-33, 1993)
  - "Trilogy" (in Judge Dredd Megazine vol. 3 #60, 1994)
- The Clown Book 2 (with writer Igor Goldkind and Robert Bliss in 2000 AD #886, 1994)
- Judge Dredd:
  - "Judge Dredd: Crime Prevention" (with writer Mark Millar in 2000 AD #872, 1994)
  - "Judge Dredd: Goodnight Kiss" (with writer Garth Ennis, in 2000 AD #940-948, 1995, collected in tpb Goodnight Kiss, 2001, ISBN 1-84023-346-X)
  - "Judge Dredd: When Judges Go Bad" (2012, US trade paperback collecting early Judge Dredd work. ISBN 978-1-78108-029-0)
  - "Judge Dredd: The Complete Case Files" Volume 20 (2013, UK trade paperback collecting early Judge Dredd work. ISBN 1781081417)
  - "Judge Dredd: The Complete Case Files" Volume 23 (2014, UK trade paperback collecting Judge Dredd: Goodnight Kiss. ISBN 1781082529 )
  - "Judge Dredd: Trauma Town" (with writer Michael Carroll in 2000 AD #1883-1887, 2014)
  - "Judge Dredd: The Mega Collection" #7, 22, 68 (Hachette, 2015, 2016, 2017)
  - "Judge Dredd: The Gyre" (with writer Michael Carroll in Judge Dredd Megazine #368-370, 2016)
  - "Judge Dredd: The Harvest" (with writer Michael Carroll in 2000 AD #2158-2161, 2019)
  - "Judge Dredd: The House On Bleaker Street" (with writer Kenneth Niemand in 2000 AD #2247-2249, 2021)
  - "Judge Dredd: Return To Billy Carter" (with writer Kenneth Niemand in Judge Dredd Megazine #460, 2023)
  - "Judge Dredd: The Darkest Judge" (2023, UK trade hardcover ISBN 1786189429 )
  - "Judge Dredd: Iron Teeth" (with writer Kenneth Niemand in 2000 AD #2382-2387, 2024)
  - "Judge Dredd: Memory Lane" (with writer Michael Carroll in Judge Dredd Megazine #474, 2024)
  - "Judge Dredd: The Shift" (with writer Kenneth Niemand in 2000 AD #2418-2425, 2025)
  - "Judge Dredd: Messengers" (with writer Kenneth Niemand in 2000 AD #2460-2462, 2025)
  - "Judge Dredd: The Black Tower" (with writer Kenneth Niemand in Judge Dredd Megazine #492-495, 2026)
  - "Judge Dredd: Nordland Rising" (2026, UK trade paperback ISBN 1837868522 )
  - "Judge Dredd: The Oubliette" Volume 1 (2027, UK trade paperback ISBN 1837869049)
  - "Judge Dredd: The Oubliette" Volume 2 (2027, UK trade paperback ISBN 1837869707)
- Vector 13: "Case Five: Shadrach" (with writer Dan Abnett, in 2000 AD #969, 1995)
- Marvel:Portraits of a Universe #1: (Hulk vs Thor interior painting for Marvel Comics, 1995)
- Sláine: "King of Hearts" (with writer Pat Mills, in 2000 AD #1033-1039, 1997, collected in a European Hardback volume, 1998)
- Slaine: "Demon Killer" (with writer Pat Mills, trade paperback, 2010, ISBN 1-906735-41-7)
- Slaine: "The Grail War" (with writer Pat Mills, trade paperback, 2013, ISBN 1781081123)
- Slaine: "2000AD The Ultimate Collection" Slaine Volume 5, trade hardback, 2019
- Dead of Night: Featuring Man-Thing (with writer Roberto Aguirre-Sacasa, 4-issue mini-series, Marvel Comics, 2008, trade paperback, ISBN 978-0-7851-2860-1)
- Legends: The Enchanted (script and art, original hardcover graphic novel, Radical Comics, 2010, ISBN 1-935417-07-X)
- Legends: The Enchanted #0 (script and art, Radical Comics, 2010)
- Mean Machine Angel: Tales from the Black Museum (with writer Michael Carroll, in Judge Dredd Megazine #358, 2015)
- Dark Souls: Legends of the Flame #1: The Labyrinth (with writer Dan Watters, Titan Comics, 2016)
- Dark Souls: Legends of the Flame #2: Action Replay (with writer George Mann, Titan Comics, 2016)
- Hellraiser: Anthology Volume 1, 2 (Seraphim Comics, 2017)
- Dark Judges: Dominion (with writer John Wagner, in Judge Dredd Megazine #386-391, 2017)
- Dark Judges: The Torture Garden (with writer David Hine, in Judge Dredd Megazine #400-409, 2018, 2019)
- Dark Judges: Deliverance (with writer David Hine, in Judge Dredd Megazine #424-433, 2020, 2021)
- Dark Judges: Death Metal Planet (with writer David Hine, in Judge Dredd Megazine #449-458, 2022, 2023)
- Dark Justice: Dominion (with writer John Wagner, hardcover collection, 2018, ISBN 978-1781086544)
- Dark Justice: The Torture Garden (with writer David Hine, hardcover collection, 2021)
- Dark Justice: Dominion: "2000AD The Ultimate Collection" Volume 94, trade hardback, 2021)
- Dark Judges: Deliverance & Death Metal Planet "2000AD The Ultimate Collection" Volume 177, trade hardback, 2024)
- 2000 Ad Vs Battle Action: Comics Collide! (2024, UK trade paperback ISBN 1837861897 )
- Fiends Of The Eastern Front: Bred In The Bone (with writer Ian Edginton in 2000 AD #2400, 2024)
- Fiends Of The Western Front: Red Tide (with writer Ian Edginton in 2000 AD #2437, 2025)

==== Covers ====
Cover artwork includes:

- 2000AD #872, 881, 948, 962, 1410, 1472, 1494, 1507, 1545, 1568, 1582, 1601, 1647, 1708, 1723, 1756, 1806, 1827, 1883, 1887, 1901, 1923, 2068, 2158, 2160, 2247, 2382, 2384, 2387, 2418, 2421, 2424, 2460, 2462
- Classic 2000AD #2
- Complete Judge Dredd #34, 36
- Overkill #41, 49 (Marvel Comics, 1994)
- Punisher Kills the Marvel Universe (Marvel Comics, 1995)
- Untamed (Boom! Studios, 2008)
- Fall of Cthulhu: Godwar #2 (Boom! Studios, 2008)
- Marshal Law: Origins (Titan Books, 2008, ISBN 1-84576-943-0)
- City of Dust #5 (Radical Comics, 2008)
- Clown Tales #1-2 (Boom! Studios, 2009)
- Hack/Slash #26 (Devil's Due Publishing, 2009)
- Stronghold (Abaddon Books, 2010)
- Legends: The Enchanted (Radical Publishing, 2010)
- Chiaroscuro Collected edition. Judge Dredd Megazine #303 (Rebellion, 2010)
- Clive Barker's Hellraiser #1-20 (Boom! Studios, 2011, 2012)
- Clive Barker's Hellraiser Vol.2 Trade Paperback (Boom! Studios, 2012)
- Clive Barker's Hellraiser: The Dark Watch Vol.3 Trade Paperback (Boom! Studios, 2014)
- Clive Barker's Hellraiser Annual #1 (Boom! Studios, 2012)
- Clive Barker's Hellraiser: The Road Below #1-4 (Boom! Studios, 2012, 2013)
- Clive Barker's Hellraiser: The Dark Watch #1, 2, 3 (Boom! Studios, 2013)
- Fangoria #303, 304, 330, 338
- H.P. Lovecraft's: The Dunwich Horror #1-4 (IDW Publishing, 2011, 2012)
- Mars Attacks #9 (IDW Publishing, 2013)
- The X-Files #4 (IDW Publishing, 2013)
- Slaine pin-up artwork, 2000AD #1848
- Judge Dredd Megazine #358, 368, 370, 386, 389, 401, 405, 409, 425, 427, 430, 433, 448, 449, 453, 456, 458, 474, 492, 495
- Judge Dredd #2, 3, 4 (IDW Publishing, 2013)
- Judge Dredd: Mega-City Two #1 (IDW Publishing, 2014)
- Judge Dredd Vol 2 #5 (IDW Publishing, 2016)
- Judge Dredd: Blessed Earth #7 (IDW Publishing, 2017)
- Judge Dredd: The Oubliette" Volume 1 (2027, UK trade paperback ISBN 1837869049)
- Judge Dredd: The Oubliette" Volume 2 (2027, UK trade paperback ISBN 1837869707)
- Anderson: Psi Division #3 (IDW Publishing, 2014)
- John Carpenter's Asylum #9, 10, 11, 12, 13, 14 (Storm King Productions, 2014, 2015)
- The New York Ripper Original Soundtrack Album cover (Death Waltz Recording, 2013)
- Silent Night, Deadly Night Original Soundtrack Album cover (Death Waltz Recording, 2014)
- Christmas Evil Original Soundtrack Album cover (Death Waltz Recording, 2014)
- The Grievous Journey of Ichabod Azrael #2 (Rebellion, 2015)
- Society Blu-ray box art (Arrow Films, 2015)
- Aliens vs Zombies #1 (Zenescope Entertainment, 2015)
- Lobster Random Collected edition. Judge Dredd Megazine #363 (Rebellion, 2015)
- Inferno #1 (Zenescope Entertainment, 2015)
- Dark Souls: Legends of the Flame #1, 2, 4 (Titan Comics, 2016, 2017)
- Dark Souls: Winter's Spite #1, 2 (Titan Comics, 2016)
- Dark Souls: Tales of Ember #1, 2 (Titan Comics, 2017)
- Dark Souls: Omnibus (Titan Books, 2018)
- Dark Souls: Box Set Edition (Titan Books, 2024)
- Assassin's Creed #13, (Titan Comics, 2016)
- Dead Signal Collected edition. Judge Dredd Megazine #383 (Rebellion, 2017)
- Warhammer 40,000 #1, 2, 3, 4, 7 (Titan Comics, 2016, 2017)
- Warhammer 40,000: Deathwatch the Lost Sons #2, 3 (Titan Comics, 2018)
- Warhammer 40,000: Dawn of War III #3, 4 (Titan Comics, 2017)
- The Chimera Brigade #1, 4, 6 (Titan Comics, 2016, 2017)
- ROM #5 (IDW Publishing, 2016)
- World War X #1, 2, 3, 4, 5, 6 (Titan Comics, 2016, 2017)
- The Guyver Blu-ray box art (Arrow Films, 2016)
- Torchwood #2.1 (Titan Comics, 2016)
- Masked: Anomalies #2 (Titan Comics, 2016)
- Samurai: Brothers in arms #4, 5 (Titan Comics, 2017)
- KHAAL #1, 2, 3, 4 (Titan Comics, 2017)
- Forever War #1, 3, 4, 6 (Titan Comics, 2017)
- Rivers of London #5 (Titan Comics, 2017)
- Hook Jaw #3, 5 (Titan Comics, 2017)
- The Mummy #4 (Titan Comics, 2017)
- Highlander #5 (IDW Publishing, 2017)
- Penny Dreadful Vol 2 #2, 6 (Titan Comics, 2017)
- Little Nightmares #1 (Titan Comics, 2017)
- Tekken #1 (Titan Comics, 2017)
- John Carpenter's Tales of Science Fiction: The Vault #1 (Storm King Productions, 2017)
- John Carpenter's Tales of Science Fiction: Vortex #1 (Storm King Productions, 2017)
- Penny Dreadful Vol 2: The Beauteous Evil (Titan Comics, 2018)
- Bloodborne #1 (Titan Comics, 2018)
- Imaginary Forces #1 (2018)
- The 77 Comic #1 (2020)
- Robin Hood: The Legend of Sherwood (Shift Magazine Presents, 2022)
- Conan the Barbarian #4, 32, 44 (Titan Comics, 2023, 2026, 2027)
- Edge Of Extinction #6 (2025)
- Arkham Mysteries Vol 2 (Soleil Productions, 2026)
- The Savage Sword of Conan #16 (Titan Comics, 2026)

=== Other ===
Other illustration work includes:

- B12 - Electro Soma CD cover and interior artwork (Warp Records, 1993)
- Fallout 2 Official promotional artwork (Interplay, 1998)
- Dungeons & Dragons: Races of Eberron: (Interior Artist for Wizards of the Coast, 2006, ISBN 0-7869-3658-4)
- The Art of H.P. Lovecraft's Cthulhu Mythos: (Interior Artist for Fantasy Flight Games, 2007, ISBN 1-58994-307-4)
- Scrye Magazine #102-105: (FW Publications, 2006, 2007)
- Fantasy Art Magazine (Cover and Interiors, 2007)
- 2D Artist Magazine (Interiors and Feature, 2008)
- Shakara: The Avenger (2000AD/Rebellion, 2009)
- Magic: The Gathering: (Artist on Set 9, 10, Coldsnap, Ravinca, Guildpact, Dissension)
- Magic: The Gathering: Commander Anthology, 2017
- Magic: The Gathering: Iconic Masters, 2017
- World of Warcraft: (Artist on Set 8 Fields of Strife, Set 9 Fields of Honor, Set 10)
- Call of Cthulhu: The Card Game: (Artist on Core Set F63)
- Anachronism: (Artist on Set 6)
- Nikolai Dante - Hero of the Revolution (2000AD/Rebellion, 2011)
- The Zombook (Graffito Books Ltd, 2012, ISBN 978-0956028457)
- The Art of BOOM! Studios: (BOOM! Studios, 2012, ISBN 978-1608860364)
- Comic Heroes Magazine Vol 1 #18: Feature artwork (Future Publishing, 2013)
- Indigo Prime - Anthropocalypse (2000AD/Rebellion, 2013)
- The Book of Scars - 30 Years of Slaine (2000AD/Rebellion, 2013, ISBN 978-1781081761)
- 2000AD Winter Special 2014 2000AD Zombies pin-up artwork (2000AD/Rebellion, 2014)
- Queen of Blood (Film poster, 2014)
- Female Werewolf (Film poster, 2015)
- Girl With A Straight Razor (Film poster, 2020)
- Defoe: 1666 (2000AD/Rebellion, 2016)
- The Grievous Journey of Ichabod Azrael (2000AD/Rebellion, 2016)
- FANGORIA: Cover to Cover (Cemetery Dance Publications, 2015, ISBN 978-1587674501)
- Voices of the Damned Interior artwork (SST Publications, 2015, ISBN 978-1-909640-35-1)
- John Carpenter's Tales for a Halloween Night Volume 2 (Storm King Productions, 2016, ISBN 978-0997059922)
- John Carpenter's Tales for a Halloween Night Volume 3 (Storm King Productions, 2017)
- John Carpenter's Tales for a Halloween Night Volume 4 (Storm King Productions, 2018)
- John Carpenter's Tales for a Halloween Night Volume 5 (Storm King Productions, 2019)
- John Carpenter's Tales for a Halloween Night Volume 6 (Storm King Productions, 2020)
- John Carpenter's Tales for a Halloween Night Volume 7 (Storm King Productions, 2021)
- John Carpenter's Tales for a Halloween Night Volume 8 (Storm King Productions, 2022)
- John Carpenter's Tales for a Halloween Night Volume 9 (Storm King Productions, 2023)
- John Carpenter's Tales for a Halloween Night Volume 10 (Storm King Productions, 2024)
- John Carpenter's Tales for a Halloween Night Volume 11 (Storm King Productions, 2025)
- Kustom Art Magazine #8 (Cover and Feature, 2016)
- Hellraiser: Blind Sadist (Seraphim Films, 2017)
- Hellraiser: The Watchers (Seraphim Films, 2017)
- Hellraiser: Nameless (Seraphim Films, 2017)
- Clive Barker: Hellraiser: Omnibus Vol 1 (BOOM! Studios, 2017)
- Clive Barker: Hellraiser: Omnibus Vol 2 (BOOM! Studios, 2018)
- Hellraiser: Anthology Vol 1 (Seraphim Comics, 2016)
- Hellraiser: Anthology Vol 2 (Seraphim Comics, 2017)
- Blood Dynasty (Film poster, 2017)
- Hook Jaw: Volume 1 (Titan Books, 2017)
- Dark Souls: The Covers Collection (Titan Books, 2018)
- Dark Souls: Omnibus (Titan Books, 2018)
- Dark Souls: The Complete Collection (Titan Books, 2021)
- Dark Souls: Box Set Edition (Titan Books, 2024)
- Penny Dreadful: The Comic Covers Collection (Titan Books, 2018)
- Delirium Magazine #25 (Interview and Feature, Full Moon Features, 2021)
- 2000AD: Covers Uncovered 2021 (2000AD/Rebellion, 2021)
- The Wrong Man (Musical release by Ross Golan. Poster artwork, 2022)
- Halftone Horrors: The History of Horror Movie Comic Books (Horrorhound, 2022)
- A Christmas Carol: The Shift Illustrated Edition (Shift Publishing, 2022)
- Classic Monsters, Modern Art: 20th Century Horror in 21st Century (Insight Editions, 2026 ISBN 979-8886637366)
