= Touching Home (film) =

- Promotional poster
- Directed by: Logan Miller; Noah Miller
- Written by: Logan Miller; Noah Miller
- Produced by: Logan Miller; Noah Miller; Jeromy Zajonc
- Starring: Ed Harris; Brad Dourif; Robert Forster
- Cinematography: Ricardo Jacques Gale
- Edited by: Robert Dalva
- Music by: Martin Davitch
- Distributed by: CFI Releasing
- Release dates: April 29, 2008 (SFIFF); April 29, 2011 (United States)
- Running time: 111 minutes
- Country: United States
- Language: English
- Budget: $2 million
- Box office: $116,353

Touching Home is a 2008 American drama film directed by Logan and Noah Miller and starring Ed Harris, Brad Dourif, and Robert Forster.

== Plot ==
The true story about a father struggling to make amends with his twin sons as they pursue their dreams of professional baseball.

== Cast ==
- Ed Harris as Charlie Winston
- Brad Dourif as Clyde Winston
- Robert Forster as Jim "Perk" Perkins
- Logan Miller as Lane Winston
- Noah Miller as Clint Winston
- Evan Jones as Timmy "Mac" McClanahan
- Lee Meriwether as Helen
- John Laughlin as Walter Houston
- James Carraway as Jimmy
- Brandon Hanson as Brownie
- David Fine as Roy Rivers
- George Maguire as Pete

== Production ==
After their homeless father died in jail, Logan and Noah Miller vowed that their autobiographical film would be made as a dedication to him. With no money and no contacts, they found Ed Harris in a San Francisco alley, and later assembled a cast and crew with 11 Academy Awards and 28 nominations.

The Miller brothers wrote a book describing the making of the film, Miller, Logan; Miller, Noah (2010). Either You're in or You're in the Way: Two Brothers, Twelve Months, and One Filmmaking Hell-Ride to Keep a Promise to Their Father.

== Reception ==
Touching Home received mixed reviews. On Rotten Tomatoes it has an approval rating of 50% rating based on reviews from 14 critics.

== See also ==
- List of baseball films
