= Sophie Simmons =

American-Canadian singer, television personality, and model (born 1992)

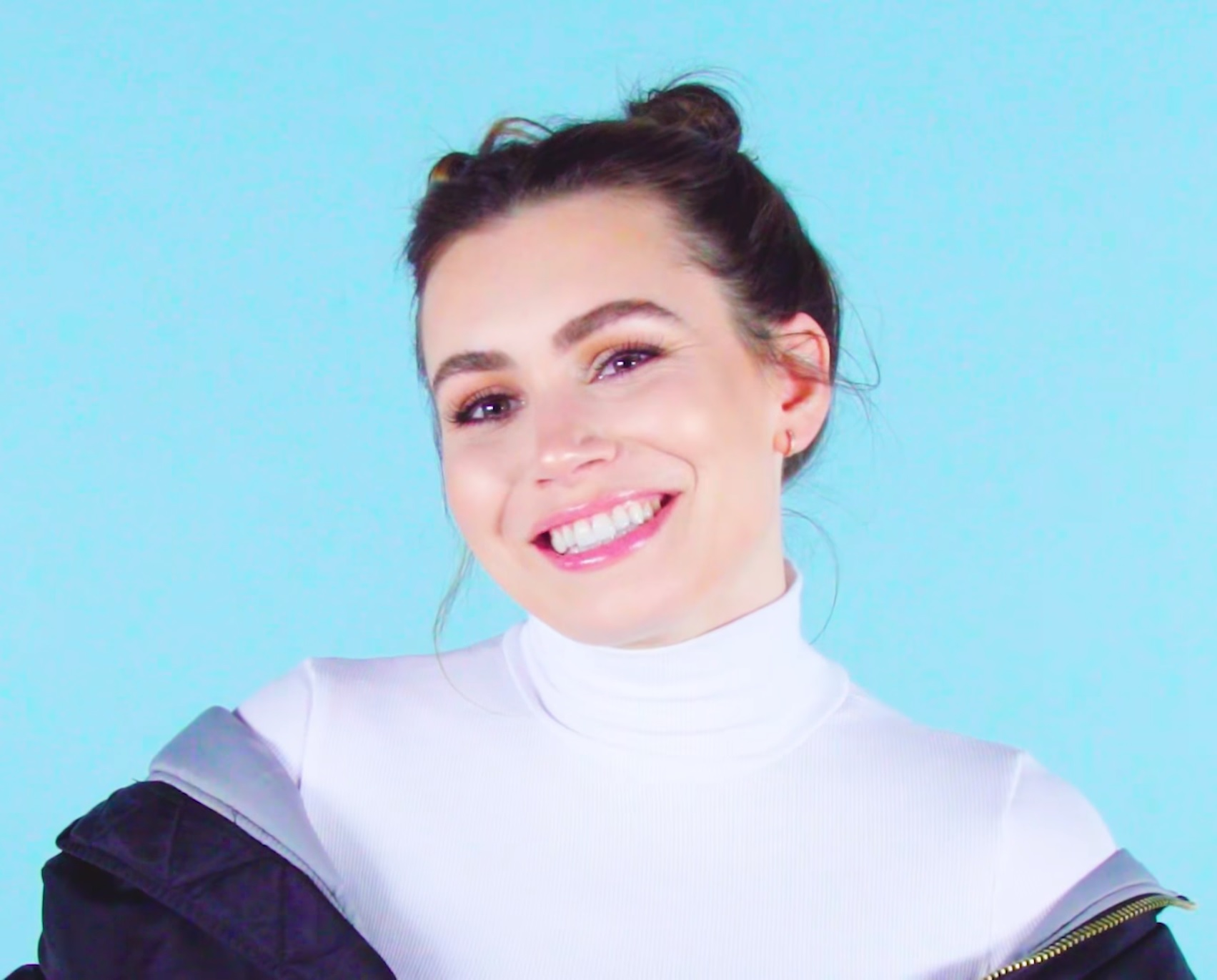
- Simmons in 2018

Background information
- Born: Sophie Alexandra Tweed-Simmons; July 7, 1992 (age 34); Los Angeles, California, U.S.
- Genres: Indie pop; EDM
- Occupations: Singer; model; actress
- Years active: 2005–present
- Citizenship: American; Canadian
- Spouse: James Henderson (m. 2023)
- Parents: Gene Simmons (father); Shannon Tweed (mother)
- Relatives: Nick Simmons (brother)
- Website: sophietsimmons.com

Sophie Alexandra Tweed-Simmons (born July 7, 1992) is an American-Canadian singer, television personality, and model who promotes body positivity.

She is also a writer and producer of several of Alan Walker's songs, as she is part of Alan's team.

== Early life ==
Simmons was born in Los Angeles, California, the daughter of Shannon Tweed, a Canadian actress and model, and Gene Simmons, an Israeli-American musician and bass player for Kiss. Sophie Simmons is a dual American and Canadian citizen.

At 13 years old, Simmons began appearing on the reality television series Gene Simmons Family Jewels on A&E. The show featuring the family of four, including her brother Nick Simmons, ran for seven seasons from 2006 to 2012.

She attended Pitzer College in Claremont, California, majoring in computer engineering and religious studies. While attending Pitzer, she played volleyball for the Pomona/Pitzer Sagehens. Simmons explained she initially actively avoided her parents' career path: "I avoided the [music and modelling world] for a long time because I didn't want the comparisons between my parents and myself".

== Career ==
In January 2012, Simmons lent her name to Sophie's Place, a partly government-funded child advocacy centre. She advocated for the creation of the centre with the help of the mayor of Surrey, British Columbia, Dianne Watts, and the Royal Canadian Mounted Police. Simmons and her family continue to support The Centre for Child Development and Sophie's Place Child and Youth Advocacy Centre by fundraising for the organizations which provide "a safe space where [children] can talk about their experience of physical, mental or sexual abuse with trained staff and law enforcement professionals."

In 2014, Simmons launched a body positive clothing line for The Style Club. She became a model, an advocate for body positivity. She was also featured in the 2016 documentary Straight/Curve which focuses on the debate over body image in modelling.

In 2012, Simmons auditioned for the second season of the Fox music competition show The X Factor USA. She advanced to the Bootcamp but was eliminated in that stage of the competition. In June 2013, she performed along with the Canadian vocal group the Tenors at their performance at the Greek Theatre in Los Angeles, California.

In 2015, Simmons released her debut single, "Kiss Me", a cover of the Sixpence None the Richer's 1998 song by the same name. In March 2017, she collaborated with the DJ duo Yellow Claw for a song on their second studio album, Los Amsterdam. Simmons is the lyricist and vocalist on the album's first track, "Home".

In early 2018, she released two solo singles, "Black Mirror" and "Burn Me Down". The music video for "Black Mirror" was released on February 23 on Billboard. Written by Simmons a year earlier, the song, like the television show from which it gets its name, deals with people's relationship with their smartphones and social media. "Black Mirror" debuted on Billboard's Dance Club Songs chart at Number 43 on April 14. The song remained on the list for ten weeks peaking at Number 20.

Simmons again wrote a single with Yellow Claw and DOLF called "Cry Wolf", released in April 2018. The song featuring Simmons on vocals was released as a single before Yellow Claw's third album, New Blood. Simmons was also credited as one of the composers on "Summertime", a song featuring San Holo on New Blood. In June 2018, she released her third solo single of the year, "Paper Cut".

== Filmography ==
Year	Title	Role	Notes
2006–2012	Gene Simmons Family Jewels	Herself	Seven seasons
2012	The X Factor	Herself	Season 2
2014	Shannon & Sophie	Herself	
2016	Country Crush	Ainsley	Hallmark Movie

== Discography ==
=== Extended plays ===
List of extended plays, with selected details
Title	Details
Different Songs, Same Sky	Released: September 22, 2023; Label: Physical Presents; Format: Digital download

=== As lead artist ===
Title	Year	Peak chart positions					Album
Title	Year	CAN	CAN AC	CAN CHR	CAN Hot AC	US Dance	Album
"Kiss Me" (cover)	2015	—	—	—	—	—	Non-album singles
"Black Mirror"	2018	—	—	—	—	20	Non-album singles
"Burn Me Down"	2018	—	—	—	—	—	Non-album singles
"Paper Cut"	2018	—	—	—	—	—	Non-album singles
"Creep"	2018	—	—	—	—	—	Non-album singles
"Sabotage"	2018	—	—	—	—	—	Non-album singles
"If I Could"	2018	—	—	—	—	—	Non-album singles
"Courage for Xmas"	2018	—	—	—	—	—	Non-album singles
"Bigger Than Yours"	2019	—	—	—	—	—	Non-album singles
"Selfish"	2019	—	—	—	—	—	Non-album singles
"Love Turns Lonely"	2021	55	23	9	10	—	Different Songs, Same Sky
"Cellophane"	2022	—	—	—	—	—	Different Songs, Same Sky
"Right to Be Wrong"	2023	—	—	—	—	—	Different Songs, Same Sky
"Crossroads"	2023	—	—	—	—	—	Different Songs, Same Sky
"—" denotes a recording that did not chart or was not released in that territory.

=== As collaborator ===
Title	Year	Album
"Kiss Me" (with Rebel)	2015	Non-album singles
"Dangerous" (with The Galaxy)	2017	Non-album singles
"Private Time" (with Cesqeaux)	2017	Non-album singles
"Home" (with Yellow Claw)	2017	Los Amsterdam
"Live at Night" (with Different Heaven)	2017	Non-album singles
"Orbit" (with Rytmeklubben)	2018	Non-album singles
"Cry Wolf" (with Dolf and Yellow Claw)	2018	Non-album singles
"Beautiful Life" (with KidWaste)	2018	Non-album singles
"Harmless Heart" (with Tom Martin)	2019	Non-album singles
"Magnets" (with Sam Feldt)	2019	Magnets
"Mine" (with Felix Cartal)	2020	Expensive Sounds for Nice People
"Rescue Me" (with Borgeous)	2020	Non-album singles
"Shadows" (with Frank Walker and Nevada)	2021	Non-album singles
"Lovesick" (with Alan Walker)	2022	Walkerverse Pt. II

=== Promotional singles ===
Title	Year	Album
"Jaded Woman"	2016	Country Crush (Original Soundtrack)
