= Igor Goldkind =

Comics writer

- Born: April 20, 1960 (age 66) Lansing, Michigan
- Area: Writer
- Notable works: The Clown

Igor Goldkind (born April 20, 1960, in Lansing, Michigan), raised San Diego, California. He is an author, poet, and lecturer who specializes in digital storytelling and information architecture.

== Biography ==
The son of San Diego State University anthropology professor Victor Goldkind and painter Margarita Zúñiga Chavaria, Goldkind's interest in literature and art began early in his childhood. Starting at the age of 14, Goldkind served as a volunteer science fiction coordinator for San Diego Comic-Con, meeting Ray Bradbury, Theodore Sturgeon, Larry Niven, and Harlan Ellison.

After attending San Francisco State University and the University of California, Santa Cruz, earning a degree in philosophy, Goldkind freelanced as a political journalist. In 1983, he moved to Paris to pursue journalism. It was here that he met and studied with Michel Foucault, the French post-structuralist. After receiving a graduate certificate from the Sorbonne, Goldkind moved to London where he worked first for Titan Books in the 1980s and then for Egmont Fleetway in the 1990s as a marketing consultant and PR spokesperson. Goldkind used the term "graphic novel", which he got from Will Eisner (who in turn got it from Richard Kyle), as a way to help sell the trade paperback comics then being published.

From 1991 to 1993, Goldkind was a regular writer for the weekly British comic, 2000 AD. Here, he worked on the ongoing Judge Hershey character, and also created The Clown, a satire on the works of Neil Gaiman

Goldkind has lectured at Liverpool University, Liverpool College, St. Martins School of Design, and the London College of Printing.

According to media releases in 2014, Goldkind was completing a collection of SF short stories entitled The Village of Light, which unfolds in and around a computer game, and his first novel, The Plague, which is set around the mass outbreak of a cognitive degenerative illness. The latter is based upon the condition of dementia and Goldkind's experiences surrounding the care of his mother. Goldkind's first work, Is She Available?, incorporates poetry, art, music, and motion, and was due to be published by Chameleon Editions in 2014.

== Bibliography ==
Comics work includes:

- "A Day in the Life" (with Glenn Fabry, in Crisis #39, 1990)
- "Nine Inches to the Mile" (with Phil Winslade, in Revolver #1, 1990)
- "The Soldier and the Farmer" (with David Lloyd and Caroline Dellaporta, in Crisis #44, 1990)
- "The Soldier and the Painter" (with Phil Winslade, in Crisis #48, 1990)
- "The General and the Priest" (with Jim Baikie, in Crisis #54–55, 1991)
- "Lord Jim" (with Steve Sampson, in Crisis #59, 1991)
- The Clown:
  - "The Clown Book 1" (with Robert Bliss, in 2000 AD #774-779, 1992)
  - "The Clown Book 2 Prologue" (with Robert Bliss, in 2000 AD #841, 1993)
  - "Vale of Tears" (with Greg Staples, in 2000AD Yearbook 1994, 1993)
  - "The Clown Book 2" (with Robert Bliss/Greg Staples/Nick Percival, in 2000 AD #881-888, 1994)
- Tharg's Future Shocks: "Lazyview Rest Home" (with Ron Smith, in 2000 AD #831, 1993)
- Strontium Dogs: "Angel Blood" (with Jon Beeston/Colin MacNeil, in 2000AD Sci-Fi Special 1993)
- Judge Hershey (with Kevin Cullen):
  - "A Game of Dolls" (in Judge Dredd Megazine vol. 2 #27-30, 1993)
  - "The Harlequin's Dance" (in Judge Dredd Megazine vol. 2 #37-40, 1993)
- Vector 13: "Case 667: Suburban Hell" (with Dix and Nick Abadzis, in 2000AD Sci-Fi Special 1996)

== Notes ==
Creative Producer for the SUBVERSIONfactory
