= Alma Beltran =

American actress

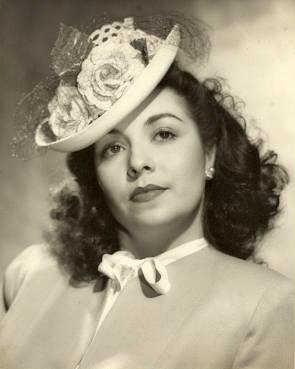
- Born: Alma Leonor Beltran; August 22, 1919; Cananea, Sonora, Mexico
- Died: June 9, 2007 (aged 87); Northridge, California, U.S.
- Occupation: Actress
- Years active: 1945–2002

Alma Leonor Beltran (August 22, 1919 – June 9, 2007) was a Mexican-American film, stage and television actress. She appeared in 82 films between 1945 and 2002. In addition to her film roles, Beltran played over 80 roles in film and television, often in smaller roles, always as Mexican women, and then later in her career, as matriarch types. She is best known as Mrs. Fuentes, mother of Julio Fuentes, on the NBC-TV series Sanford and Son.

== Career ==
Beltran's career began in 1940 with her dancing, singing, and playing a guitar.

In 1953 Beltran had a six-days-a-week Spanish-language broadcast on radio station KALI. Programmed for housewives, the show included one drama a week that Beltran wrote. Other segments featured fashion news, household hints, poems, and news about Mexico.

The theater was Beltran's first love. She said, "I would never want to get away from the theater" adding that the interaction between audiences and performers was essential to a person's development as an artist. In July 1942 she was a new member of the company at the Padua Hills Theatre. She starred in Miracle of Tepeyac Hill at the Philharmonic Auditorium in Los Angeles on November 27, 1954. More than 3,000 people attended the play, which was a fundraising effort for completion of the Shrine of Our Lady of Guadalupe in Mexico City. Her other work on stage included portraying Matilde in Cuando La Vida Florece (When Life Blooms) at the Teatro Intimo in Los Angeles in 1969. When she performed in The Subject Was Roses at the Pasadena Playhouse in 1983, a newspaper review said, "Alma Bertran, perhaps the strongest portrayal in the cast, captures the universal qualities of mothering".

Beltran portrayed the grandmother on the situation comedy Sanchez of Belair on the USA network, and she made commercials for TV.

== Personal life and death ==
Beltran was married to Orlando Bertran. She died in Northridge, California, on June 9, 2007, aged 87, due to natural causes. She was interred at Forest Lawn Memorial Park in Los Angeles, California.

== Filmography ==
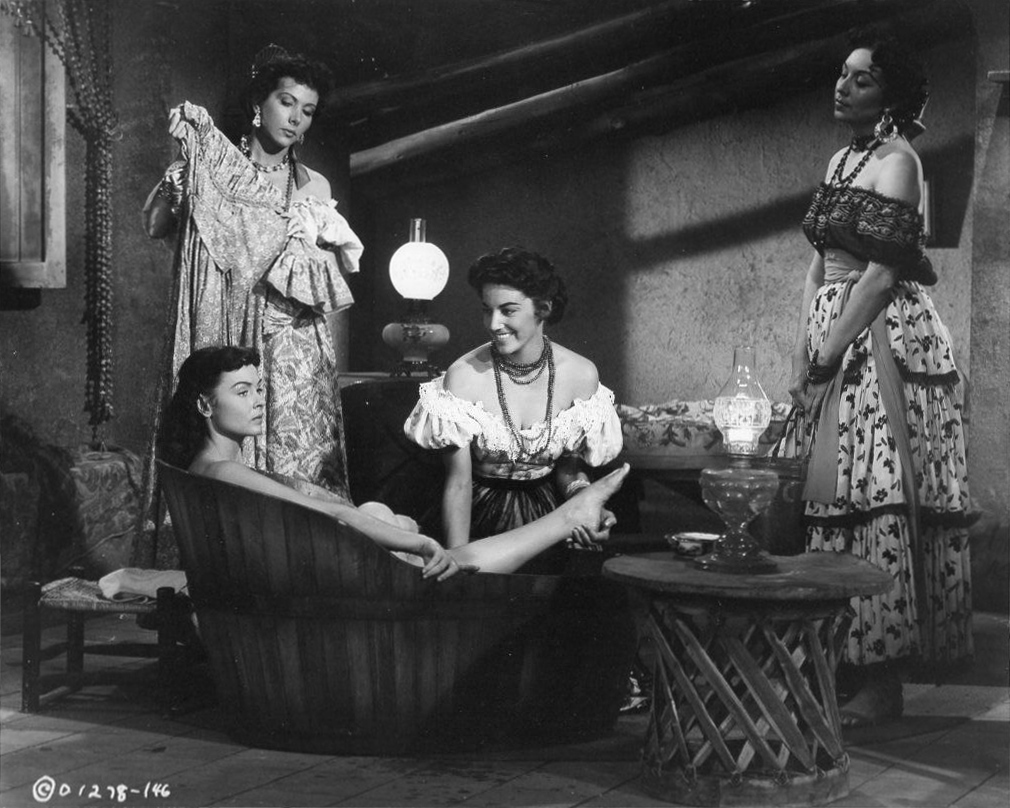
With Donna Reed in the 1953 Colombia Western Gun Fury.

Film credits
Year	Title	Role	Notes
1945	Pan-Americana	Miss Guatelmala	Uncredited
1945	Mexicana	Modern Girl	
1945	Yolanda and the Thief	Maid	Uncredited
1947	Honeymoon	Maid	Uncredited
1947	Carnival in Costa Rica	Bit part	Uncredited
1948	The Loves of Carmen	Trinket Seller	Uncredited
1948	He Walked by Night	Miss Montvalo (Liquor Store proprietor)	Uncredited
1953	Sombrero	Party Guest	Uncredited
1953	Gun Fury	2nd Mexican girl	Uncredited
1954	Jubilee Trail	Servant girl	Uncredited
1955	The Sea Chase	Beautician	Uncredited
1956	The Bottom of the Bottle	Cantina Hostess	Uncredited
1956	Santiago	Cuban Woman	Uncredited
1957	Dragoon Wells Massacre	Station Agent's wife	
1968	Blue	Cantina Proprietess	
1971	Red Sky at Morning	Excilda Montoya	
1971	Josie's Castle	Tijuana Saleslady	
1971	The Marriage of a Young Stockbroker	Raquel	
1972	They Only Kill Their Masters	Rosa	
1974	The Parallax View	Joy Holder	
1975	A Woman for All Men	Anita	
1976	Marathon Man	Laundress	
1977	Another Man, Another Chance	Mexican Widow	Uncredited
1978	House Calls	Gina	
1980	Herbie Goes Bananas	General's Wife	
1980	Oh, God! Book II	Rosa, Paula's Housekeeper	
1981	Zoot Suit	Lowrider's Mother	
1985	Into the Night	Cleaning woman	
1986	Nobody's Fool	Jennieva	
1987	Love Among Thieves	Airline Clerk	TV movie
1989	Trust Me	Imelda	
1989	Immediate Family	Spanish woman	
1990	Angel Town	Neighbor's Wife	
1990	Ghost	Woman Ghost	
1994	Night Fire	Maria	
2000	Luminarias	Mary	
2002	Buying the Cow	Hispanic woman	(final film role)
