= John Laughlin (actor) =

American actor

- Born: April 3, 1956 (age 70); Memphis, Tennessee, U.S.
- Occupation: Actor
- Years active: 1978–present

John Laughlin (born April 3, 1956), sometimes credited as John C. McLaughlin or John McLaughlin, is an American film and television actor. He lived in Van Nuys, CA in the early 1980s.

== Career ==
Since 1978, he has appeared in over 25 films and at least 30 television productions.

== Filmography ==
=== Film ===
Year	Title	Role	Notes
1978	Mag Wheels	Steve	
1979	Summer Camp	Matt	
1982	An Officer and a Gentleman	Troy	
1982	The Tragedy of King Lear	Soldier / Courtier	Direct-to-video
1984	Footloose	Woody	
1984	The Hills Have Eyes Part II	"Hulk"	
1984	Crimes of Passion	Bobby Grady	
1985	Space Rage	Walker	
1988	Midnight Crossing	Jeff Schubb	
1991	Motorama	Man At Wagon Wheel	
1992	The Lawnmower Man	Jake Simpson	
1992	Under Siege	Ziggs	Uncredited
1994	The Other Man	Jack	
1994	Improper Conduct	Michael Miller	
1994	Night Fire	Barry	
1996	The Rock	US Air Force Chief of Staff General Peterson	
1997	Storm Trooper	Stark	Uncredited
1998	Malaika	Nick Saunders	
1999	Operation Delta Force 4: Deep Fault	Garcia	
2003	Gacy	Detective Kay	Direct-to-video
2003	Ghost Rock	Sheriff Clay	
2006	Love's Abiding Joy	Samuel Doros	
2008	Touching Home	Walter Houston	
2012	Fortress	Base Commander	
2012	Sixufus	Brandon Russell	
2015	The Good, the Bad, and the Dead	Howard	
2016	WEAPONiZED	Richard Morgan	

=== Television ===
Year	Title	Role	Notes
1978	Star Wars Holiday Special	Imperial Stormtrooper	Television film
1979	Insight	Craig	Episode: "A Friend in Deed"
1980–1981	The White Shadow	Paddy Falahey	15 episodes
1982	The Powers of Matthew Star	Brian	Episode: "Jackal"
1982	The Dukes of Hazzard	Gregory	Episode: "The Treasure of Soggy Marsh"
1982	High Powder	Rick Goodwin	Television film
1983	Trapper John, M.D.	Gordon "Gordo"	Episode: "South Side Story"
1983	Tucker's Witch	Gary Burke	Episode: "Murder Is the Key"
1984	CBS Schoolbreak Special	John Evans III	Episode: "Dead Wrong: The John Evans Story"
1985	Murder with Mirrors	Wally Markham	Television film
1985	Streets of Justice	Hudson James	Television film
1986	If Tomorrow Comes	Charles Stanhope	Episode #1.1
1986–1988	Murder, She Wrote	Mike Lowery / Bill Ainsley	2 episodes
1987	The Equalizer	Jake Hughes	Episode: "Carnal Persuasion"
1988	Longarm	Codie Branch	Television film
1989	China Beach	Brendan McMurphy	2 episodes
1989	Knots Landing	Security Guard	Episode: "Never Judge a Book by Its Cover"
1990	Equal Justice	Boyce	2 episodes
1991	Fire: Trapped on the 37th Floor	Milner	Television film
1992	Memphis	Rufus Hutton	Television film
1993	Silk Stalkings	Landau	Episode: "Dead Weight"
1993	Tales from the Crypt	Johnny	Episode: "Food for Thought"
1996	Back to Back	Lieutenant Tony Dussecq	Television film
1997	Knots Landing: Back to the Cul-de-Sac	Robert Simons	2 episodes
1997	Soldier of Fortune, Inc.	Victor Carlton	Episode: "Missing in Action"
2001	That's Life	Captain	Episode: "Banister Head"
2001	Strong Medicine	Tom Wolenski	Episode: "Zol Zein Gezint"
2010	Criminal Minds	Ranger Walter Turner	Episode: "Into the Woods"
2011	The Defenders	Lance Cahill	Episode: "Nevada v. Donnie the Numbers Guy"
2012	Dark Desire	Gus	Television film
2014	Web of Lies	Detective Pharr	Episode: "Baby You're Mine"
2014	Funny Business	Barry	Television film
2017	NCIS	Navy Captain Alan Redding	Episode: "Fake It 'Til You Make It"
2019	I Am the Night	Captain Foster	Episode: "Dark Flower"
