= Shannon Tweed =

Canadian model and actress (born 1957)

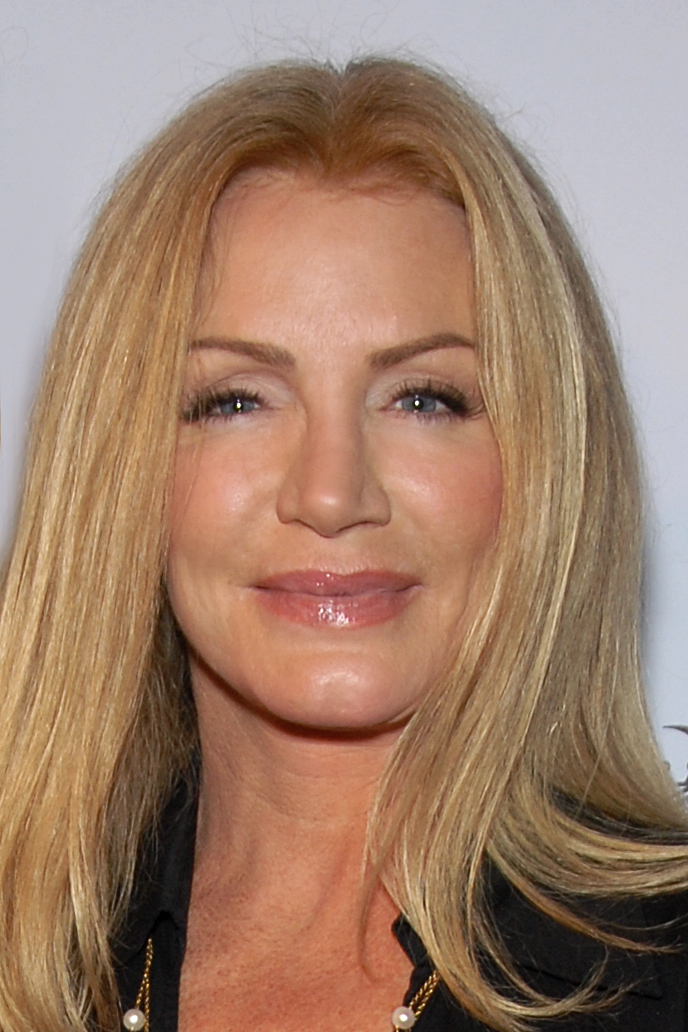
- Tweed in 2007
- Born: Shannon Lee Tweed; March 10, 1957 (age 69); St. John's, Newfoundland, Canada
- Occupations: Model; actress
- Years active: 1981–present
- Spouse: Gene Simmons (m. 2011)
- Children: Nick Simmons; Sophie Simmons

Playboy centerfold appearance
- November 1981
- Preceded by: Kelly Tough
- Succeeded by: Patricia Farinelli

Playboy Playmate of the Year
- 1982
- Preceded by: Terri Welles
- Succeeded by: Marianne Gravatte

Shannon Lee Tweed Simmons (born March 10, 1957) is a Canadian model and actress. One of the most successful actresses of mainstream erotica, she is identified with the genre of the erotic thriller cinema. Tweed has appeared in more than 60 films and several television series. She was Miss November 1981 and was later named as 1982's Playmate of the Year.

Tweed is also known for Gene Simmons Family Jewels, a reality TV show that portrayed the life of her family from 2006 until 2012. She is married to Gene Simmons, bassist and co-lead singer of the band Kiss; Tweed and Simmons have two children, Nicholas Adam Tweed-Simmons and Sophie Alexandra Tweed-Simmons.

== Early life ==
Tweed was born on March 10, 1957, in St. John's, Newfoundland. She is the daughter of Donald Keith Tweed, a mink rancher, and Louise (née Wall) Tweed, and was raised on a mink ranch in Whitbourne. She is one of seven children and has three sisters, including actress Tracy Tweed.

After Donald Tweed fell into a coma following a car crash, Louise moved with her children to her mother's home in Saskatoon, Saskatchewan, and studied nursing while the family survived on welfare. Shannon had breast enhancement surgery at the age of 20 and subsequently became involved in beauty pageants.

== Career ==
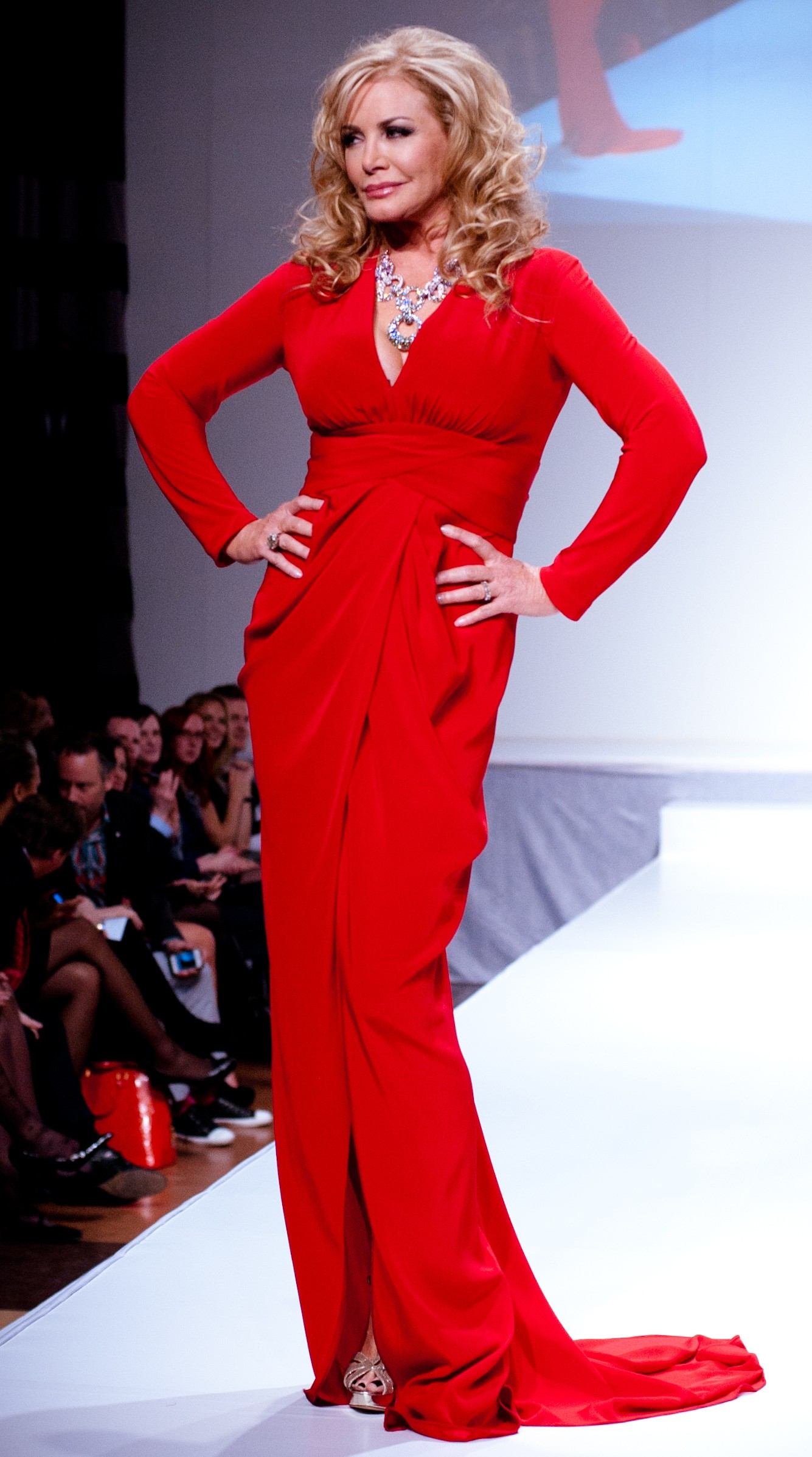
Tweed in the 2012 Heart Truth celebrity fashion show

In 1978, Tweed was the third runner-up in the Miss Canada Pageant event and won the Miss Canada talent competition for her singing.

After the Canadian wish-fulfilment TV show Thrill of a Lifetime arranged for her to pose for Playboy magazine, Tweed was chosen to be the Playmate of the Month for the November 1981 issue, and eventually the Playmate of the Year for 1982. Tweed and her sister Tracy appeared together in a Playboy spread.

Tweed primarily acted in B movies and in television series such as the HBO comedy 1st & Ten and the prime-time soap opera Falcon Crest, She also appeared in an episode of The Dukes of Hazzard as well as Married... with Children. In 1985, she landed a year-long role on Days of Our Lives as Savannah Wilder. During the 1988-89 season, Tweed was a regular panelist on the Canadian-produced game show The New Liar's Club, which aired in both Canada and the US.

Additionally, Tweed has appeared as a guest on Frasier. She has also lent her voice to the Nickelodeon cartoon SpongeBob SquarePants in the episode "20,000 Patties Under the Sea", which also featured Gene Simmons as a guest.

The first major theatrical film in which Tweed appeared was the horror film Of Unknown Origin (1983). Since then, Tweed has appeared in more than 60 films, including Detroit Rock City, produced by Simmons, in 1999. Tweed and her sister Tracy co-starred in the film Night Eyes 3. She is known as one of the most successful actresses of mainstream erotica. Vanity Fair has described Tweed as "one of home video's most rented erotic thriller goddesses".

Tweed was featured along with her family on the reality TV show Gene Simmons Family Jewels from 2006 until 2012. One of the highlights of the series was Simmons' proposal to her and their subsequent marriage at the Beverly Hills Hotel in Beverly Hills, California. In 2010, an episode of the series was taped in Tweed's former hometown of Saskatoon. During the visit, she was presented with an honorary street sign denoting the (nonexistent) "Tweed Lane". Tourism Saskatoon subsequently requested Saskatoon City Council approve the naming of a real Tweed Lane in her honour. The Council approved the request, and the street is located in the neighbourhood of Rosewood.

Tweed is the narrator of the reality TV show Ex-Wives of Rock.

== Personal life ==
Tweed resided at the Playboy Mansion for approximately 14 months as Playboy founder Hugh Hefner's partner. The relationship coincided with her Playmate appearances and with being named 1982 Playmate of the Year. The Mansion was the location of her first meeting with her future husband, musician Gene Simmons. Tweed has been in a relationship with Simmons since 1983. In a 2011 interview, Simmons said, "I need Shannon in my life. Not just because of love and family but because she holds me accountable." After 28 years together, the couple wed in an outdoor evening ceremony on the crystal lawn of The Beverly Hills Hotel on October 1, 2011.

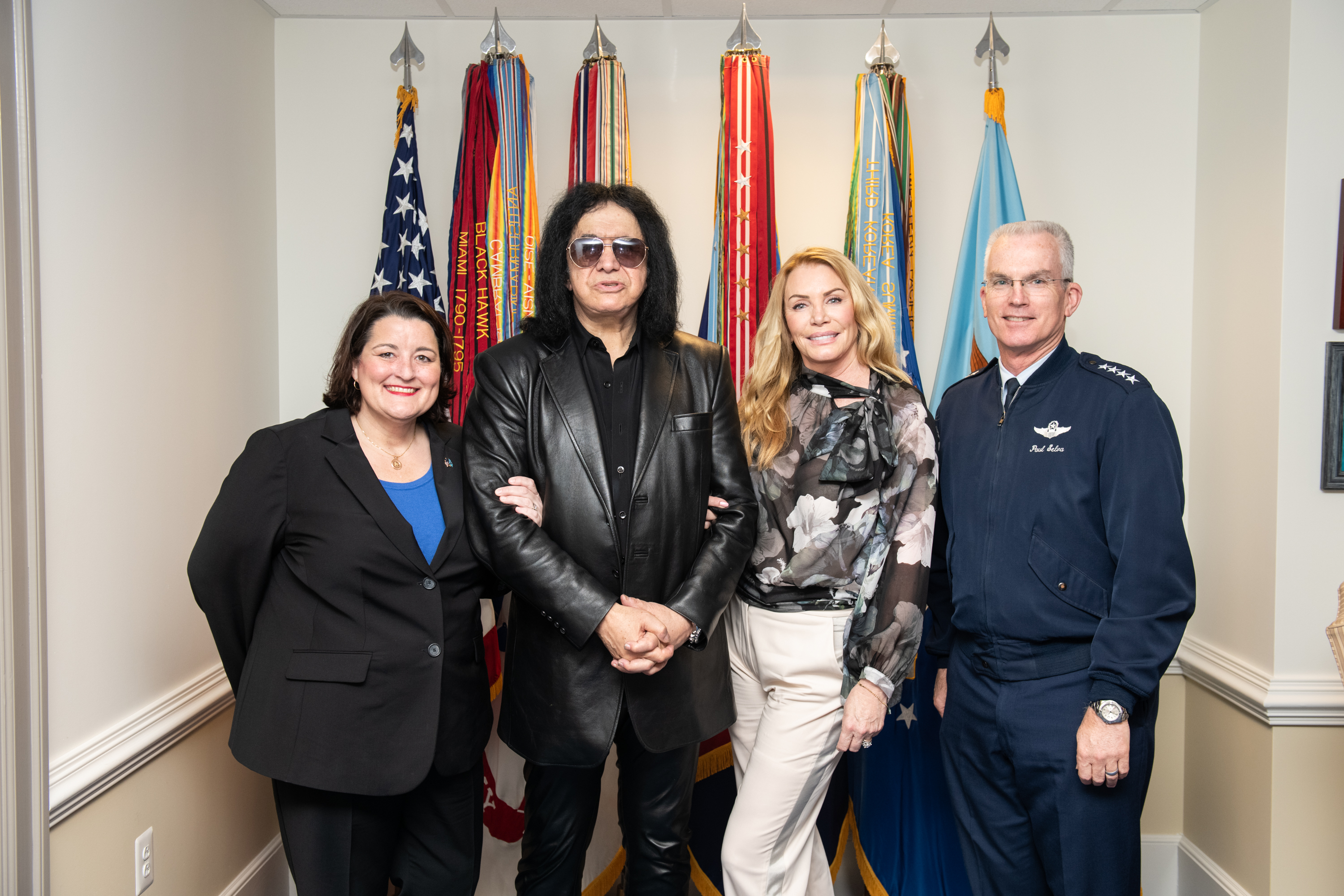
Tweed (second from right) visiting The Pentagon with her husband Gene Simmons in 2019

== Filmography ==
=== Film ===
Year	Film	Role	Notes
1983	Curtains	Body Double	Uncredited
1983	Of Unknown Origin	Meg Hughes	
1983	Playboy Video Playmate Review	Herself	
1984	Hot Dog…The Movie	Sylvia Fonda	
1984	The Surrogate	Lee Waite	
1986	Meatballs III: Summer Job	The Love Goddess	
1987	Steele Justice	Angela Spinelli	
1987	Dragnet	Baitmate	Uncredited
1987	Code Name Vengeance	Sam	
1988	Lethal Woman	Tory MacAllistair, Ex-Pilot	
1988	The Firing Line	Sandra Spencer	
1989	Cannibal Women in the Avocado Jungle of Death	Dr. Margo Hunt	
1989	Night Visitor	Lisa Grace	
1989	Playboy Playmates of the Year: The 80's	Herself	Documentary
1990	In the Cold of the Night	Lena	
1991	Last Call	Cindy / Audrey	
1991	The Last Hour	Susan	
1992	Liar's Edge	Heather Burnz	
1992	Night Eyes 2	Marilyn Mejenes	
1992	The Naked Truth	The First Class Stewardess	
1992	Sexual Response	Eve Anderson	
1993	Cold Sweat	Beth Moore	
1993	Night Eyes 3	Zoe Clairmont	
1993	Indecent Behavior	Dr. Rebecca Mathis	
1994	Possessed by the Night	Carol McKay	Direct-to-video
1994	Scorned	Patricia Langley / Amanda Chessfield	
1994	Hard Vice	Andrea	
1994	Night Fire	Lydia	
1994	Indecent Behavior 2	Dr. Rebecca Mathis	
1994	Illicit Dreams	Moira Davis	
1995	No Contest	Sharon Bell	
1995	Victim of Desire	Carla Duvall	
1995	The Dark Dancer	Dr. Margaret Simpson	
1995	Body Chemistry IV: Full Exposure	Dr. Claire Archer	Direct-to-video
1995	Indecent Behavior 3	Dr. Rebecca Mathis	Associate producer
1996	Stormy Nights	Jennifer McCormick	
1996	Electra	Lorna Duncan / Electra	
1996	White Cargo	Alexia	
1996	Playboy: 21 Playmates Centerfold Collection	Herself	Documentary
1997	No Contest II	Sharon Bell	
1997	Human Desires	Alicia Royale	Direct-to-video; Associate producer
1997	Bimbo Bash Movie	Margo	
1997	Java Heads: The Movie		
1997	Playboy Celebrity Centerfold: Shannon Tweed	Herself	Documentary
1998	Naked Lies	Cara Landry	Associate producer
1998	Dead by Dawn	Wendy Marsh	
1998	Playboy: Celebrities	Herself	Documentary
1998	Playboy: Babes of Baywatch	Herself	Documentary
1999	Detroit Rock City	Amanda Finch	
1999	Forbidden Sins	Maureen Doherty	
1999	Scandalous Behavior	Lisa Blair	Direct-to-video; Associate producer
1999	Playboy: Playmate Pajama Party	Herself	Documentary
2000	The Rowdy Girls	Velvet McKenzie	Co-producer
2000	Diaries of Darkness		
2001	Dead Sexy	Kate McBain	Direct-to-video; Executive producer
2002	Wish You Were Dead	Lesbian Hitwoman	
2003	Sex at 24 Frames Per Second	Herself	Interviewee; Documentary
2004	Playboy: 50 Years of Playmates	Herself, Miss November 1981	Documentary
2014	Sex, Marriage and Infidelity	Margaret	
2014	A Very Satan Christmas	Herself	Short
2014	The Ultimate Wedding Planner	Herself	Documentary
2014	Gone South: How Canada Invented Hollywood	Herself	Documentary

=== Television ===
Year	Film	Role	Notes
1982	Drop-Out Father	Beautiful Woman	TV film
1982–1983	Falcon Crest	Diana Hunter	21 episodes
1983	Fantasy Island	Celina Morgan	Season 7 episode 7: "The Wedding Picture/Castaways"
1983	Match Game/Hollywood Squares Hour	Herself	Panelist; 5 episodes
1984	The New Mike Hammer	Karen Thorsen	Season 1 episode 9: "The Perfect Twenty"
1984	Family Feud	Herself	Episode: "Battle of the Perfect 10's: Wilt's Wows vs. Debbies Dudes; Richard's Rosebuds vs. Phyllis Fighters"
1984	The First Olympics: Athens 1896	Woman	Mini-series; Uncredited
1984	The Dukes of Hazzard	Betty Jo Page	Season 7 episode 2: "Welcome, Waylon Jennings"
1984–1987	The Hitchhiker	Barbara / Dr. Rita de Roy	Season 2 episode 6: "Videodate"; Season 4 episode 6: "Doctor's Orders"
1985	Three's a Crowd	Princess Leanna	Episode 20: "King for a Day"
1985	Playboy Mid Summer Night's Dream Party 1985	Herself	Documentary
1985–1986	Days of Our Lives	Savannah Wilder	142 episodes
1986	Cagney & Lacey	Vicki Barrington	Season 6 episode 5: "Role Call"
1986	Highway to Heaven	Nina Van Slyke	Season 3 episode 12: "Oh Lucky Man"
1987	The Last Fling	Joanne Preston	TV film
1987	CBS Summer Playhouse	Beth	Season 1 episode 15: "Sirens"
1987	Nine to Five	Tiffany Crystal	Season 5 episode 1: "Meet Mr. Felb"
1987	Ohara	Randi	Season 2 episode 1: "Y' Wanna Live Forever?"
1987	L.A. Law	Jocelyn Miller	Season 2 episode 1: "The Lung Goodbye"
1987	21 Jump Street	Jody Kleinman	Season 2 episode 9: "You Oughta Be in Prison"
1987	Hooperman		Season 1 episode 7: "Hot Wired"
1987	Rags to Riches	Babe Adair	Season 2 episode 9: "Beauty and the Babe"
1987	Sex Symbols; Past, Present and Future	Herself	Documentary
1988	Our House	Maxine Denton	Season 2 episodes 16 and 17: "Trouble in Paradise: Part 1" and "Trouble in Paradise: Part 2"
1988	Longarm	Sally "Crazy Sally"	TV film
1989	Dear John	Margo	Season 1 episode 20: "Margo"
1989	Desperado: The Outlaw Wars		Uncredited
1989–1991	1st & Ten	Kristy Fullbright	30 episodes
1990	Hollywood Dog		TV film
1991	Tagteam	Leona	TV film
1991	Parker Lewis Can't Lose	Ms. Mason	Season 2 episode 5: "The Undergraduate"
1991	Baywatch	Allison Fowles	Season 2 episode 11: "If Looks Could Kill"
1991	Fly by Night	Sally "Slick" Monroe	13 episodes
1992	Civil Wars	Luree	Season 1 episode 8: "For Better or Perverse"
1993	Matrix	Andrea Hopper	Episode 2: "To Err Is Human"
1994	Hot Line	Rebecca	Season 1 episodes 5 and 6: ""Payback" and "Payback"
1994	Model by Day	Shannon	TV film
1995	Married... with Children	Shannon Tweed	Season 10 episode 9: "The Two That Got Away"
1995	Murder, She Wrote	Priscilla Lake	Season 11 episode 15: "Twice Dead"
1995	Marker	Samantha Kent	Episode 12: "Factor X"
1995–2001	Frasier	Dr. Honey Snow	Season 2 episode 15: "You Scratch My Book..."; Season 9 episode 2: "Don Juan in Hell: Part 2"
1996	Pacific Blue	Sheila Silver	Season 1 episodes 1 and 8: Pilot and "Burnout"
1997	Homeboys in Outer Space	Delia	Episode 18: "The Naked and the Dred, or the Toast of the Town"
1997	Wings	Emily Palmer	Season 8 episode 21: "Oedipus Wrecks"
1997	Nash Bridges	Bess	Season 3 episode 2: "Payback"
1997	Assault on Devil's Island	Hunter Wiley	TV film
1997–1998	The Tom Show	Maggie Amross	Episodes 2, 12, and 16: "Bad Publicity," "Maggie Returns," and "The Centerfold"
1999	Assault on Death Mountain	Hunter Wiley	TV film
1999	Powerplay	Jacqueline Knight	TV film
1999	V.I.P.	Herself	Season 1 episode 15: "Val on the Run"
1999	Beggars and Choosers	Shannon Tweed	Season 1 episode 8: "Unsafe Sex"
1999	Get Real	Joanna Parsons	Episode 3: "Passages"
2000–2003	The Parkers	Sophia Van Lowe	Season 1 episode 19: "Moving on Out"; Season 3 episode 20: "Mother's Day Blues"; Season 5 episode 11: "Out with the Old, in with the New"
2002	My Guide to Becoming a Rock Star	Mom	11 episodes
2003	Run of the House	Ms. Dee Dee Cole	Episode 5: "Where There's Smoke, There's Fire"
2003	Banzai	Herself	Uncredited
2004	Frasier: Analyzing the Laughter	Dr. Honey Snow	Uncredited
2004	When Playboy Ruled the World	Herself	Documentary
2006	Playboy: Celebrity Centerfolds	Herself	Documentary
2006–2012	Gene Simmons Family Jewels	Herself	158 episodes
2007	SpongeBob SquarePants	Woman Fish	Voice; Season 5 episode 17: "20,000 Patties Under the Sea/The Battle of Bikini Bottom"
2008	Are You Smarter than a 5th Grader?	Herself, Audience Member	
2009	Hugh Hefner: Playboy, Activist and Rebel	Herself: Playmate of the Year 1982 / Actress	Documentary
2010	United States of Tara	Knatasha Knightblade	Season 2 episode 7: "Dept. of F'd Up Family Services"
2010	Bill Zucker's Day with the Simmons	Herself	
2012	How Playboy Changed the World	Herself	Documentary
2012	America's Book of Secrets	Herself	Season 1 episode 6: "The Playboy Mansion"
2012–2013	Republic of Doyle	Frances Lemont	Season 3 episode 2: "Head Over Heels"; Season 5 episode 7: "Hook, Line and Sinker"
2014	Seed	Wendy Maybely	Season 2 episode 7: "Mother Sucker"; Credited as Shannon Tweed-Simmons
2014	Canada's Smartest Person	Herself, Lie Detector Guest	Season 1 episode 6: "#1.6"; Credited as Shannon Tweed-Simmons
2013	Ex-Wives of Rock	Herself	Narrator
2014	Shannon & Sophie	Herself	Executive producer
2014	13 Nights of Elvira	Dr. Margo Hunt	Episode 1: Cannibal Women in the Avocado Jungle of Death
2015	Sunday Brunch		Set decorator Episode 6: "The Smoking Pistol"
2017	Hell's Kitchen	Herself	Season 17 episode 4: "Just Letter Cook"

== See also ==
- List of people in Playboy 1980–1989

Karen Price	Vicki Lasseter	Kymberly Herrin	Lorraine Michaels	Gina Goldberg	Cathy Larmouth
Heidi Sorenson	Debbie Boostrom	Susan Smith	Kelly Tough	Shannon Tweed	Patricia Farinelli
