= Incarnation (disambiguation) =

Incarnation literally means embodied in flesh or taking on flesh.

Incarnation may also refer to:

- Incarnation (Christianity), the belief that the pre-existent divine person of Jesus Christ, was "made flesh"
- Incarnation (album), by In Hearts Wake, 2024
- Incarnation (Cecil Taylor album), 1999
- "Incarnation", a song by Vader from the album De Profundis

== See also ==
- Incarnations (disambiguation)
- Incarnate (disambiguation)
