= Caliber (Radical Comics) =

Comic book written by Sam Sarker

Caliber is a comic book published by Radical Comics. Caliber was written by Sam Sarker and illustrated by Garrie Gastonny. It was published in a miniseries comic book format.

== Description ==
Caliber is a retelling of the Arthurian legend set in the Pacific Northwest during the times of the frontier. Because of the changed setting, the characters have guns instead of swords. Instead of Caliber being a sword as tradition has it, it is also a gun, a six-shooter gun. The gun has the magical power of never missing when the shooter is attempting to attain a just cause, bringing a new aspect to the sword. As in the traditional story, young Arthur goes in hunt for Caliber, albeit in a different way because of the different time period. In addition, Arthur will not only have to retrieve the weapon; he will only be able to use it in a just way.

== Film adaptation ==
A motion picture will be produced based on this work by Johnny Depp's Infinitum Nihil production company.
