= Trespass (2011 film) =

2011 film

- Theatrical release poster
- Directed by: Joel Schumacher
- Written by: Karl Gajdusek
- Produced by: Rene Besson; Irwin Winkler; David Winkler
- Starring: Nicolas Cage; Nicole Kidman; Ben Mendelsohn; Cam Gigandet; Liana Liberato; Jordana Spiro; Dash Mihok; Emily Meade; Nico Tortorella
- Cinematography: Andrzej Bartkowiak
- Edited by: Bill Pankow
- Music by: David Buckley
- Production companies: Saturn Films; Nu Image; Winkler Films
- Distributed by: Millennium Entertainment
- Release dates: September 14, 2011 (TIFF); October 14, 2011 (United States)
- Running time: 90 minutes
- Country: United States
- Language: English
- Budget: $38.7 million
- Box office: $10.1 million

Trespass is a 2011 American crime thriller film directed by Joel Schumacher and written by Karl Gajdusek. It stars Nicolas Cage and Nicole Kidman as a married couple taken hostage by extortionists. It also stars Ben Mendelsohn, Cam Gigandet, Liana Liberato, Jordana Spiro, Dash Mihok, Emily Meade and Nico Tortorella.

It had its world premiere at the Toronto International Film Festival on September 14, 2011. It was released in a limited release and through video on demand on October 14, 2011, by Millennium Entertainment. It is the last film to be directed by Schumacher before his death on June 22, 2020.

== Plot ==
The Miller family lives in a mansion in Shreveport, Louisiana where the father Kyle Miller works as diamond merchant. The house is later invaded by robbers masquerading as police. They consist of leader Elias, his girlfriend Petal, his younger brother Jonah and a large man named Ty.

Meanwhile, the youngest Miller, Avery, is harassed at a party by its host, Jake. Disgusted, she returns home, where she is captured. To the robbers' dismay, the family turns out to be bankrupt; all of their possessions were bought on loaned credit and Kyle only earns a meager income from appraising diamonds from his former clients to pay off the mortgage of the house. Enraged, Elias breaks Kyle's hand and takes a diamond necklace from Sarah, her mother. However, the necklace is discovered to be a worthless replica.

During a moment of distraction, Kyle and Avery attempt an escape and set off the house's security system. They are attacked by Ty, whom Kyle knocks out with a syringe from the robbers.

Thinking that Ty is dead, Elias shoots Kyle in the leg. Elias is actually a drug dealer working for a crime syndicate. One night, he and Petal were carjacked at gunpoint, and $180,000 worth of drugs was stolen from them. Faced with threats of retribution, Elias was forced to commit a heist (under the supervision of henchman Ty) to pay off his debt. Jonah suggested the mansion as a place to rob.

Avery is then forced to answer a call from the security company and convince them to call off the police. Nonetheless, a security guard shows up and recognizes Jonah as a former employee, prompting the latter to kill him.

The only thing of any worth on Kyle turns out to be his life insurance. Desperate, Elias prepares to kill Kyle. To save her father’s life, Avery announces that she can help steal a lot of money from the safe in Jake’s house during his party. Elias reluctantly agrees and sends Petal to supervise Avery. Driving to the party, Avery plans to seduce Jake and steal his money but is horrified after learning Petal's plan to massacre everyone there (including Avery) and take the cash as she is high on drugs. Accelerating the car, Avery unbuckles Petal's seat belt and crashes into a telephone pole. Then, she handcuffs an incapacitated Petal to the car.

At the mansion, Jonah turns out to be mentally ill and off his medications. He is enamored with Sarah and believes they had an affair when he was a technician installing the house's security system. Ty reawakens from his stupor and attacks Sarah. Enraged, Jonah fights Ty. To defend his brother, Elias kills Ty. In his dying breath, Ty reveals that the men who stole Elias' drug shipment were members of the syndicate. The operation was done to blackmail him into stealing more money for them. Jonah had masterminded the entire plan to have an excuse to return to the mansion and profess his love to Sarah. Shocked, Elias refuses to believe Ty.

Through the chaos, Sarah and a wounded Kyle escape to a tool shed behind the house. In the ensuing fight with the thieves, a partition is broken, revealing hidden money; Kyle had sold Sarah's real diamond necklace and was saving the money as a nest egg for his family when he noticed his capital declining. Avery then appears, pointing a gun at the thieves. To defend himself, Elias aims his gun at Sarah. For this, he is killed by Jonah. Trying to sacrifice himself, Kyle tells his family to run while setting the money on fire after noticing a leaking gas canister that was turned over earlier in the tussle. He also shoots Jonah's foot with a nail gun, trapping him in the shed. Sarah tries to help Kyle but is grabbed in a last-ditch effort by Jonah, who believes it is destiny to die with her in the fire. Kyle then shoots Jonah dead and Sarah carries Kyle away to safety just as the shed collapses.

Kyle wants Sarah to let him die so that she and Avery can survive on his life insurance fund, but she refuses, as she loves him regardless of how much money he has. After calling the police, Avery runs back to her parents, and the three embrace.

== Cast ==
- Nicolas Cage as Kyle Miller
- Nicole Kidman as Sarah Miller
- Ben Mendelsohn as Elias
- Cam Gigandet as Jonah
- Liana Liberato as Avery Miller
- Jordana Spiro as Petal
- Dash Mihok as Ty
- Emily Meade as Kendra
- Nico Tortorella as Jake
- Terry Milam as Travis
- Brandon Belknap as Dylan
- Tina Parker as Security Operator
- Dave Maldonado as Security Guard
- Nilo Otero as Mr. Big
- Simona Williams as Mrs. Big
- Matthan Harris as Party Guest
- Christopher Márquez as Party Goer
- Caroline M. Schreiber as Party Girl
- Sam Velasquez as Party Boy
- Stephen Stanton
- Marchello Stewart as Date
- Gracie Whitton as Young Avery
- Joshua Wilkins as Partygoer

== Production ==
Production was disrupted on August 3, 2010, when it was reported that Cage had abandoned the project as he had allegedly insisted on switching roles from Kidman's husband to the kidnapper. According to reports, the role was then offered to Liev Schreiber. However, the following day Cage resumed his role as the husband. Due to the confusion over casting, the production start date was moved from August 16 to 30. Proof of filming showed up on Entertainment Weekly's online site. In the photo, Nicole Kidman and Nicolas Cage are being held at gunpoint. The film marks the second collaboration between Schumacher and cinematographer Andrzej Bartkowiak after working together on Falling Down. This is also Bartkowiak's first project in cinematography since he filmed Thirteen Days and began his career as a film director.

== Reception ==
=== Box office ===
Trespass was given a limited release for one week in ten theaters in North America and earned $24,094 and an additional $9,988,226 internationally on a production budget of $35 million.

=== Critical response ===
Trespass was panned by critics and has a rating of 9% on Rotten Tomatoes based on 76 reviews with an average score of 3.3 out of 10. The consensus states: "Another claustrophobic thriller that Joel Schumacher can churn out in his sleep, Trespass is nasty and aggressive, more unpleasant than entertaining." Criticism focused primarily on the film's script and plot, including its great resemblance to the Spanish film Kidnapped. However, the film also received some positive reviews from mainstream critics, praising the performances of Kidman, Gigandet, and Mendelsohn.

Mary Pols of Time magazine named it one of the Top 10 Worst Movies of 2011. The film earned a Razzie Award nomination for Nicolas Cage as Worst Actor (also for Drive Angry and Season of the Witch), but lost to Adam Sandler for Jack and Jill and Just Go with It.

== See also ==
- List of films featuring home invasions
