= The Last Days of American Crime =

2020 film

- Official promotional poster
- Directed by: Olivier Megaton
- Written by: Karl Gajdusek
- Based on: The Last Days of American Crime by: Rick Remender; Greg Tocchini
- Produced by: Jesse Berger; Jason Michael Berman; Barry Levine
- Starring: Édgar Ramírez; Michael Pitt; Anna Brewster; Patrick Bergin; Sharlto Copley
- Cinematography: Daniel Aranyó
- Edited by: Mickael Dumontier
- Music by: David Menke; The Limiñanas
- Production companies: Radical Studios; Mandalay Pictures
- Distributed by: Netflix
- Release date: June 5, 2020
- Running time: 149 minutes
- Country: United States
- Language: English

The Last Days of American Crime is a 2020 American action thriller film directed by Olivier Megaton from a screenplay by Karl Gajdusek, based on the 2009 comic by Rick Remender and Greg Tocchini. It stars Édgar Ramírez, Anna Brewster, Michael Pitt, Patrick Bergin, and Sharlto Copley.

The film's release was considered unfortunate for coinciding with the George Floyd protests due to its violent content and depictions of police brutality. It received negative reviews from critics, earning a 0% rating on Rotten Tomatoes as of October 2026.

== Plot ==
In 2024, the U.S. government prepares to activate the American Peace Initiative (API) signal, a "synaptic blocker" that will prevent the population from breaking the law. In Detroit, Graham Bricke leads a crew of bank robbers including his brother Rory, who begins a prison sentence. The API signal is tested while Bricke's crew robs a bank, and one of the thieves is killed. Bricke lies to the Dumois crime family that he lost the stolen money, which he saves to escape to Canada, but is notified that Rory has killed himself in prison.

One week before the signal's nationwide deployment, Bricke's money is taken. He tortures a man named Sidell into confessing that Johnny Dee, a member of Bricke's crew, betrayed him to the Dumois syndicate. Bricke leaves Sidell to die in a fiery explosion, kills Johnny, and buys a deadly neurotoxin at a bar, where he is seduced by Shelby Dupree. He meets her fiancé Kevin Cash, who explains that he and Rory were used to test the signal in prison, and Rory was killed by the guards. Shelby and Kevin reveal their plan to rob the city's "money factory" by disrupting an API signal tower and fleeing across the river to Canada.

Bricke takes over the heist and through surveillance of the facility he finds out that over $1 billion in new and used bills is being stored there. He also deduces that Kevin is the heir to the Dumois family. Shelby and Bricke begin an affair, and he recruits his trusted getaway driver Ross. The government is buying back criminals' ill-gotten wealth, and Shelby, a gifted hacker, prints $5 million in counterfeit bills which Bricke arranges to trade in. Following Shelby, Bricke learns she is an informant for the FBI, who threaten her younger sister to ensure her cooperation. As the city's police department prepares to become obsolete, Officer William Sawyer is forced to kill an assailant in self-defense. He joins the new law enforcement division, and receives an implant making him immune to the API signal.

Kevin takes Bricke to meet Rossi Dumois, his father. Rossi shoots and wounds Kevin, who kills him with an axe, and Kevin and Bricke raid Rossi's weapons, including three EFP cone warheads. Bricke confronts Shelby for working with the FBI, but is knocked out and beaten by Lonnie, Rossi's lieutenant. Shelby is taken hostage by Lonnie as Sidell, alive but disfigured, tortures Bricke and leaves him to die in a fire. Bricke is rescued by Ross and pursues Lonnie, who injects Shelby with heroin and prepares to rape her, but Bricke kills him.

On the day the signal will deploy, Ross infiltrates the money factory in a garbage truck, and Shelby subdues a systems manager at an API facility. Bricke and Kevin deliver the counterfeit $5 million to the factory and shoot their way to the vault, which they breach with the warheads. Shelby hacks the API system and disrupts the signal, allowing Bricke, Kevin, and Ross to load the truck with money and escape. Sawyer detains Shelby, and the signal resumes, incapacitating Ross and Bricke. Unaffected, Kevin kills Ross, revealing that he and Rory were forced to fight in prison by the guards, who tortured them with the API signal; Kevin learned to overcome the signal, and killed Rory. He shoots Bricke, but is killed by Shelby’s FBI handlers, who tell Bricke that they will kill Shelby to close their case.

Left to die, Bricke consumes his neurotoxin; instead of killing him, it ends the signal's effect on him. He kills the FBI agents and escapes in the truck full of money. Struggling against the signal, Shelby fights off Sawyer, who strangles her but is impaled on a glass shard and dies. Shelby blows up the facility, ignoring the agents preparing to shoot her. She is rescued by Bricke, and they plow through the border checkpoint into Canada. Shelby tells Bricke she loves him before he dies from his wounds, and she flees with a bag of money. Some time later, Shelby spreads Rory's ashes at a lake, and drives away with her sister to a new life in Canada.

== Cast ==
- Édgar Ramírez as Graham Bricke
- Anna Brewster as Shelby Dupree
- Michael Pitt as Kevin Cash
- Daniel Fox as Rory
- Tamer Burjaq as Ross King
- Sharlto Copley as William Sawyer
- Brandon Auret as Lonnie French
- Patrick Bergin as Rossi Dumois
- Sean Cameron Michael as Pete Slatery

== Production ==
The film had first been announced on November 18, 2009 by Rick Remender in an interview with Mania, in which he revealed Sam Worthington would star. A press release was then put out a day later, confirming Worthington's involvement as actor and producer. Barry Levine and Jesse Berger would produce through Radical Studios. Remender would write the screenplay and serve as executive producer. In May 2011, F. Gary Gray became attached to direct, with Karl Gajdusek writing the screenplay, as IM Global began sales at the Cannes Film Market. In March 2012, Anthony Mandler replaced Gray as director. Noomi Rapace had also been rumored to have a role in the film.

On July 27, 2018, it was announced that Édgar Ramírez would star as career criminal Graham Bricke and Olivier Megaton would be the new director, while the screenplay would still be written by Gajdusek. Jason Michael Berman of Mandalay Pictures and Kevin Turen joined as new producers alongside Levine and Berger. In October 2018, Anna Brewster, Michael Pitt, and Sharlto Copley joined the cast of the film.

Principal photography on the film began on November 6, 2018. Filming took place in Cape Town and Johannesburg in South Africa.

== Release ==
The Last Days of American Crime was released digitally by Netflix on June 5, 2020. It was the top-watched film on the service in its first weekend.

== Reception ==
On the review aggregator website Rotten Tomatoes, 0% of 41 critics' reviews are positive, with an average rating of 2.6/10. The website's consensus reads: "This Crime is punishment." Metacritic, which uses a weighted average, assigned the film a score of 15 out of 100, based on 12 critics, indicating "overwhelming dislike".

Variety wrote that critics panned the film as "a derivative work that has nothing to say" and that the timing of its release with the murder of George Floyd and the related protests was "a disaster". David Ehrlich of IndieWire gave the film a "D−" and said, "[it's] not just because Olivier Megaton's agonizingly dull Netflix feature is 149 minutes long (a crime unto itself). While there's never really a good moment to introduce a bad movie into the world, this hollow and artless dystopian heist dreck is also a victim of its own relevance." Peter Debruge of Variety called the film "gory, excessive and frequently incoherent" and wrote: "In light of everything that's going on, The Last Days of American Crime seems woefully out of touch, inadvertently offensive (a brutal fight scene in which Copley chokes Shelby seems oblivious to the legacy of real-world police brutality) and like some sloppy relic of what once passed for entertainment." Bilge Ebiri, writing for Vulture, described the film as "yet another insipidly sleazy, lizard-brain shoot-’em-up that through its very dullness demonstrates how rote such ghastly fare has become in our culture", and concluded: "The Last Days of American Crime offers nothing you haven’t seen any number of times before; it just offers a lot of it."

Jesse Hassenger of The A.V. Club gave the film a grade of C−, writing: "In its final hour, The Last Days of American Crime finally gets down to the business of its big heist, revealing both the propulsive entertainment value the filmmakers have been inexplicably stalling and the thinness of the whole enterprise."

== See also ==
- Black Lives Matter
- List of films with a 0% rating on Rotten Tomatoes
- Blue Lives Matter
