= Night Fire =

1994 film

- Directed by: Mike Sedan
- Produced by: Mike Sedan
- Starring: Shannon Tweed; John Laughlin; Rochelle Swanson; Martin Hewitt; Alma Beltran; Jeff Fitzpatrick; Lisa Welch
- Cinematography: Zoran Hochstätter
- Edited by: Thomas Meshelski
- Music by: Miriam Cutler
- Release date: 12 October 1994
- Running time: 97 min.
- Country: United States
- Language: English

Night Fire is a 1994 American drama thriller film directed and produced by Mike Sedan. Its music was directed by Miriam Cutler. The film stars Shannon Tweed, John Laughlin, Rochelle Swanson, Martin Hewitt and Alma Beltran in the lead roles.

== Cast ==
- Shannon Tweed as Lydia
- John Laughlin as Barry
- Rochelle Swanson as Gwen
- Martin Hewitt as Cal
- Alma Beltran as Maria
- Jeff Fitzpatrick as Man in Alley
- Lisa Welch as Woman in Alley
