= Liar's Edge =

- Directed by: Ron Oliver
- Written by: Ron Oliver
- Produced by: Ray Sager
- Starring: Shannon Tweed; David Keith
- Cinematography: Brenton Spencer
- Edited by: Stan Cole
- Music by: Paul Zaza
- Release date: February 14, 1992 (Buffalo)
- Running time: 97 minutes
- Country: Canada
- Language: English

Liar’s Edge is a 1992 Canadian thriller drama film written and directed by Ron Oliver and featuring Shannon Tweed and David Keith.

== Cast ==
- Nick Shields as Mark Burnz
- Shannon Tweed as Heather Burnz
- David Keith as Gary Kirkpatrick
- Joseph Bottoms as Dave Kirkpatrick
- Christopher Plummer as Harry Weldon
