= Legends: The Enchanted =

2010 graphic novel

Cover of the book

Legends: The Enchanted is a stand-alone comic book and graphic novel written and illustrated by Nick Percival published by Radical Comics in June 2010. The series takes inspiration from the characters of traditional folklore and fairytales.

== Plot ==
Legends is set in a fictional world settled by creatures known as the Enchanted. The world of the Enchanted has much violence spurned on by different technologies, nature, and dark magic. The characters in the Enchanted world come from traditional folklore and literature, and include Rapunzel, Hansel and Gretel, and Red Hood. These traditional characters have grown up and changed into “outlaws, vigilantes, [and] bounty hunters.” In addition, the characters have become protected by a charm that renders them almost immortal.

== Reception ==
Legends: The Enchanted won the HorrorNews Net award for Best Original Graphic Novel 2010 and was nominated for an Eagle Award for Favourite Single Story 2010.

== Film adaptation ==
On June 17, 2010, it was announced that Brian Grazer and Ron Howard would be bringing Legends to the big screen.
