= Incarnations (disambiguation) =

Incarnations are deities or divine beings in human/animal form on Earth.

Incarnations may also refer to:

- Incarnations (album), a 1995 album by New Zealand-Australian band Dragon
- The Incarnations, a 2014 novel by Susan Barker

== See also ==
- Incarnation (disambiguation)
- Incarnate (disambiguation)
- List of people who have been considered deities by incarnation
