= Gene Simmons Family Jewels =

American television series (2006–2012)

- Genre: Reality
- Created by: Gene Simmons; Leslie Greif; Adam Reed
- Starring: Gene Simmons; Shannon Tweed; Nick Simmons; Sophie Simmons
- Country of origin: United States
- Original language: English
- No. of seasons: 7
- No. of episodes: 160

Production
- Running time: 23–46 minutes

Original release
- Network: A&E
- Release: August 7, 2006 – July 14, 2012

Gene Simmons Family Jewels is an American reality television series that aired on A&E from August 7, 2006, to July 14, 2012. It follows Kiss bassist and vocalist Gene Simmons, his longtime partner and wife Shannon Tweed, and their two children, Nick and Sophie.

"It is very much like The Osbournes," Simmons noted. "But I believe that people will see us on television and see how I run things and the rules I make, and they'll think, 'Put that guy in charge!'"

Although it is presented as a reality series, some events shown did not actually occur. One of these was in the finale of Season 3: the viewer is led to believe Gene purchased the Australian Football team Carlton Football Club. In reality, there is no record of the team being sold to him. Additionally, the episode shows Simmons convincing Brendan Fevola to join Carlton Football Club, while in reality Fevola had been playing for Carlton since he was drafted in 1998. Other events include casting biker extras, as well as a bit actor in the show.

Prior to the third season, the series was the second highest rated series on A&E, behind Dog the Bounty Hunter. In Australia, the series is shown on The Biography Channel every Wednesday at 8:30 pm on Foxtel and Austar. It is also shown on the free to air channel 7mate. The first three seasons were played back to back ending on April 1, 2009. Seasons 1-5 have been released on DVD. Season 6 premiered on June 14, 2011, on A&E with the episode "Breaking Up Is Hard To Do." In addition to relationship troubles between Simmons and Tweed, that culminated in the two marrying, the season shows Simmons' March 2011 visit to Israel. After the show's most successful season ever, Gene Simmons Family Jewels returned for its seventh season on Monday, May 28, 2012, with a special one-hour premiere. In August 2012, A&E announced the seventh season would be the last, and Simmons added that he would not shop the series to other networks and, instead, will focus on the Kiss tour and other business commitments.

== Episodes ==
=== Series overview ===
Season	Episodes	Originally released	
Season	Episodes	First released	Last released
1	13	August 7, 2006	October 30, 2006
2	23	March 25, 2007	August 26, 2007
3	33	March 11, 2008	August 24, 2008
4	20	June 7, 2009	August 16, 2009
5	26	March 21, 2010	January 2, 2011
6	26	June 14, 2011	October 18, 2011
7	17	May 28, 2012	July 14, 2012

=== Season 1 (2006) ===
No. overall	No. in season	Title	Original release date
1	1	"Happily Unmarried"	August 7, 2006
Gene plans a surprise party for Shannon.
2	2	"Next Generation Rock Star"	August 7, 2006
Gene gives advice to Nick's band.
3	3	"Driving Me Crazy"	August 14, 2006
Gene challenges Nick to a driving contest.
4	4	"The Demon Lives"	August 21, 2006
Gene performs at VH1 Rock Honors. Shannon wants another baby.
5	5	"Food or Sex?"	August 21, 2006
Gene and Shannon go to a weight loss spa.
6	6	"Sexercise!"	August 28, 2006
Gene takes Sophie to an exercise filming for career day.
7	7	"The Un-Anniversary"	September 11, 2006
Gene goes to New York to visit his mother and start a bikini car wash business.
8	8	"Loose Change"	September 18, 2006
Gene takes Nick on a business trip to teach him a lesson about money.
9	9	"Fan...tastic"	September 25, 2006
A fan spends the day with Gene.
10	10	"Horsin' Around"	October 2, 2006
Shannon buys Sophie a horse.
11	11	"Gene's Addiction"	October 9, 2006
To get Gene to stop working, The family tricks him into taking a vacation.
12	12	"Shrinkwrapped"	October 23, 2006
Shannon takes Gene to a psychotherapy session.
13	13	"Behind the Makeup"	October 30, 2006
Shannon tells Gene he should get a face lift.

=== Season 2 (2007) ===
No. overall	No. in season	Title	Original release date
14	1	"Under the Knife?"	March 25, 2007
Gene prepares for a face lift, but has to go appear on MTV.
15	2	"A Bun in the Oven?"	March 25, 2007
Shannon, Nick and Tracy wait for pregnancy test results.
16	3	"Gene's Big Mouth"	April 1, 2007
Gene suggests that Shannon should adopt a child.
17	4	"Nice Day for a Facelift"	April 1, 2007
Gene and Shannon get a face lift.
18	5	"Face Off"	April 8, 2007
Complications of the face lift make Shannon stay in the hospital.
19	6	"Stir Crazy"	April 15, 2007
Shannon comes home to recover with Gene; Gene ignores doctor's orders.
20	7	"Snowblind"	April 22, 2007
Shannon goes to Aspen; Gene interviews a snowboarder Sophie likes.
21	8	"Coming Out Party"	April 29, 2007
Gene misses a charity event, so he tries home remedies to heal faster.
22	9	"The Wingman"	May 6, 2007
Gene takes a divorced man on a night on the town in Las Vegas.
23	10	"Uncle Gene Wants You"	May 20, 2007
Gene and Sophie go to Camp Pendleton and train as U.S. Marines.
24	11	"Growing Pains"	June 3, 2007
Nick is planning to go to college.
25	12	"Master Gene Theatre"	June 10, 2007
Recap of Season 1; includes outtakes and interviews.
26	13	"British Invasion"	June 17, 2007
Gene takes Nick to England for his 18th Birthday; Nick records at Abbey Road Studios.
27	14	"All Grown Up"	July 8, 2007
A French fashion photographer spots Sophie and wants her to shoot.
28	15	"Rich Dad"	July 15, 2007
Gene practices volleyball for Sophie's father-daughter volleyball tournament.
29	16	"Alpha Male"	July 22, 2007
The family goes camping.
30	17	"Sucker Bet"	July 29, 2007
Gene finds out that Shannon bets $100,000 on a horse at the Kentucky Derby.
31	18	"...And They're Off!"	July 29, 2007
Gene frets over Shannon's $100,000 bet on a horse; Nick throws a Graduation party.
32	19	"Trapped in Paradise"	August 5, 2007
Gene travels to the Turks and Caicos Islands on business.
33	20	"Genetopia"	August 12, 2007
Shannon and Tracy go on Speed-Dating; Gene considers buying an island.
34	21	"Fact or Fiction? Part 1"	August 19, 2007
Gene plans to take a Lie Detector test to determine the truth of his sexual exploits.
35	22	"Fact or Fiction? Part 2"	August 19, 2007
Gene and Shannon find out the results of the Lie-Detector test.
36	23	"It Was a Very Good Year"	August 26, 2007
Recap of season 2 with deleted scenes from season 2 episodes

=== Season 3 (2008) ===
No. overall	No. in season	Title	Original release date
37	1	"Gene's Best Friend"	March 11, 2008
38	2	"Liar, Liar, Tongue on Fire"	March 11, 2008
39	3	"The Brutal Truth Part 1"	March 18, 2008
40	4	"The Brutal Truth Part 2"	March 18, 2008
41	5	"Before the Flood"	March 25, 2008
42	6	"Knock, Knock, Who's There?"	March 25, 2008
43	7	"Swing Gene"	April 12, 2008
44	8	"Something's Fishy"	April 8, 2008
45	9	"Nail Me"	April 15, 2008
46	10	"Shannon B. DeMille"	April 22, 2008
47	11	"Lil' Gene"	April 29, 2008
48	12	"Ladies of the Night"	May 6, 2008
49	13	"Sophie Couture"	May 13, 2008
50	14	"Viewer Mail"	May 20, 2008
51	15	"Mommy Make-Over"	June 3, 2008
52	16	"Gene the Apprentice"	June 15, 2008
53	17	"Gene's Ego Trip"	June 15, 2008
54	18	"The Gene Simmons Roast Part 1"	June 15, 2008
Note: This was a special 3-part episode that is not included on the season 3 DVD. It is on The Roast Edition DVD.
55	19	"The Gene Simmons Roast Part 2"	June 15, 2008
Note: This was a special 3-part episode that is not included on the season 3 DVD. It is on The Roast Edition DVD.
56	20	"The Gene Simmons Roast Part 3"	June 15, 2008
Note: This was a special 3-part episode that is not included on the season 3 DVD. It is on The Roast Edition DVD.
57	21	"Shannon to the Rescue"	June 22, 2008
58	22	"Honeymoon at Last"	June 22, 2008
59	23	"Power Outage"	June 29, 2008
60	24	"Nick After Dark"	June 29, 2008
61	25	"South of the Border Part 1"	July 13, 2008
62	26	"South of the Border Part 2"	July 13, 2008
63	27	"Happy Birthday...To Whom?"	July 20, 2008
64	28	"Raw & Uncut"	July 20, 2008
65	29	"X-Gene"	July 27, 2008
66	30	"Homesick"	August 3, 2008
67	31	"Fan Favorites"	August 10, 2008
68	32	"GeneHarmony"	August 17, 2008
69	33	"Gene Down Under"	August 24, 2008

=== Season 4 (2009) ===
No. overall	No. in season	Title	Original release date
70	1	"Sophie's Sweet 16 Part 1"	June 7, 2009
Gene throws Sophie her Sweet 16 party.
71	2	"Sophie's Sweet 16 Part 2"	June 7, 2009
Gene throws Sophie her Sweet 16 party.
72	3	"Memphis Blues"	June 14, 2009
Gene and Nick visit Memphis, and Nick sings the blues.
73	4	"Fireman Gene"	June 14, 2009
Gene's mother sets him up to teach fire safety at a fundraiser.
74	5	"Godfather Gene Part 1"	June 21, 2009
Gene is chosen by "Uncle Tony" to be his grandson's godfather.
75	6	"Godfather Gene Part 2"	June 21, 2009
Gene is chosen by "Uncle Tony" to be his grandson's godfather.
76	7	"Economic Stimulus"	June 28, 2009
Gene visits New York to ring the Stock Exchange bell.
77	8	"Slumber Party"	June 28, 2009
Gene has to monitor Sophie's slumber party.
78	9	"The Night from Hell"	July 12, 2009
Sophie puts a cheating boyfriend through the wringer.
79	10	"Who Dunnit?"	July 12, 2009
Shannon guilts the family into throwing a themed party.
80	11	"Puppy Love"	July 19, 2009
Gene tries to find a new dog for his nephews and lends them Snippy.
81	12	"Grapes of Wrath"	July 19, 2009
Gene doesn't want to offend an investor.
82	13	"Dirty Little Secrets"	July 26, 2009
Gene and Nick are both caught in embarrassing situations that they must hide from Shannon.
83	14	"Movin' Out"	July 26, 2009
Nick decides it's time to leave the nest after a foreign exchange student moves in for the summer.
84	15	"Derby Queen"	August 2, 2009
The 3 kids convince Shannon to return to acting.
85	16	"Fresh Meat"	August 2, 2009
While Shannon is recovering from an accident, Gene handles the day-to-day household chores; Nick entertains a friend and his mother.
86	17	"Gene the Slacker"	August 9, 2009
When Gene finds himself with a week of nothing to do, the family gets a sense of what it would be like if he didn't work so much and hatches a plan to show him their appreciation.
87	18	"Rootin' Tootin' Gene"	August 9, 2009
Gene travels to Nashville as a favor to KISS' manager and takes a promising but bickering country band under his wing.
88	19	"Sex and Rock N' Roll"	August 16, 2009
Nick's band hits a roadblock when all of their gear is stolen moments before their debut gig. Meanwhile, Shannon convinces Gene to be social and attend a dinner party that unknowingly has another agenda.
89	20	"Letters Lost"	August 16, 2009
While Gene is in Japan filming a monster movie, Shannon and Tracy go antiquing and buy a piece of furniture that sends them on a search for its original owner.

=== Season 5 (2010–11) ===
No. overall	No. in season	Title	Original release date
90	1	"Shannon the Brave"	March 21, 2010
Shannon has a health scare; Gene is torn between being home with his kids and being on tour. Note: This was a one-hour episode.
91	2	"Waiting Is The Hardest Part"	March 28, 2010
Gene waits for the results of Shannon's biopsy.
92	3	"The Demon Turns 60"	March 28, 2010
Gene has a 60th Birthday Party.
93	4	"Kisstastrophe"	April 4, 2010
Gene is interviewed by a journalist, Shannon comes to visit. Note: This was a one-hour episode.
94	5	"Like Father, Like Son"	April 11, 2010
Nick's girlfriend is upset about Nick's commitments. Gene goes to Singapore.
95	6	"Gene Gets Punked"	April 18, 2010
Doc plays a prank on Gene while on tour.
96	7	"Don't Mess with the Simmons"	April 25, 2010
Shannon and Tracy host a "Tazer Party"
97	8	"Gene the Croc Hunter"	May 2, 2010
Gene is in New Orleans working on a business deal involving alligators.
98	9	"Smarty Pants"	May 9, 2010
Gene goes on "Are You Smarter Than A Fifth Grader?" and asks a group of college students to help him develop a slogan for a new marketing client.
99	10	"KISSteria"	May 9, 2010
KISS plans to tour Australia, but poses problems.
100	11	"The Best 100th Episode Ever"	July 20, 2010
Shannon and Tracy watch the band on tour, Nick and Sophie try to catch up.
101	12	"Hunks With Hammers"	July 27, 2010
Sophie creates a business for a school project. Casey Bond is interviewed, and lends his handsome handyman skills to the Simmons family.
102	13	"Love Thy Neighbor"	July 27, 2010
Shannon builds a pool house.
103	14	"Pest Control"	August 3, 2010
Gene hunts for an animal he believes is running around the house.
104	15	"Detroit Rock Mommies"	August 3, 2010
KISS Tour begins. Gene finds a band he wants to sign on his record company.
105	16	"The Geeks Shall Inherit the Earth"	August 10, 2010
Gene goes to Comic-Con with Nick to promote Incarnate (Nick's comic book).
106	17	"Gene's Evil Twin"	August 17, 2010
Gene is sick and has to cancel a press event for the KISS tour.
107	18	"For the Love of Rock"	August 24, 2010
Gene is asked to be a mentor for the Ludacris Foundation.
108	19	"Face Your Demons"	December 5, 2010
Gene visits Anne Frank's house
109	20	"What Happens in Vegas..."	December 12, 2010
Gene and Shannon go to Las Vegas to see Cirque du Soleil on Nick's 21st Birthday.
110	21	"Gene's Handicap"	December 19, 2010
Gene registers in a charity golf tournament.
111	22	"God of Thunder"	December 19, 2010
Shannon sends Gene to a doctor over a snoring problem.
112	23	"Three's a Crowd"	December 26, 2010
Shannon joins Gene on tour in Madrid.
113	24	"My Fair Lady"	December 26, 2010
Shannon gets a visit from a friend.
114	25	"Keeping Up With The Demons"	January 2, 2011
Nick travels with KISS in Europe.
115	26	"Scaredy Cat"	January 2, 2011
Gene spends the night on a supposedly haunted ship.

=== Season 6 (2011) ===
No. overall	No. in season	Title	Original release date
116	1	"Breaking Up Is Hard To Do:Part 1"	June 14, 2011
Fed up with Gene's philandering ways, Shannon leaves to reevaluate their relationship.
117	2	"Breaking Up Is Hard To Do:Part 2"	June 14, 2011
Fed up with Gene's philandering ways, Shannon leaves to reevaluate their relationship.
118	3	"KISS Your Family Goodbye"	June 21, 2011
Gene develops a bad case of empty nest syndrome.
119	4	"You Always Hurt the Ones You Love"	June 21, 2011
A Demon's work is never done - and neither is Nick and Sophie's as they try to bring Gene and Shannon back together.
120	5	"Blood Is Thicker Than Hummus:Part 1"	June 28, 2011
Gene, Shannon, and Nick travel back to Gene's homeland of Israel where Gene receives an award from the mayor of his hometown. Shannon arranges for Gene to meet his half-brother Kobi and his three half-sisters and they visit the grave of Gene's father.
121	6	"Blood Is Thicker Than Hummus:Part 2"	June 28, 2011
Gene, Shannon, and Nick travel back to Gene's homeland of Israel where Gene receives an award from the mayor of his hometown. Shannon arranges for Gene to meet his half-brother Kobi and his three half-sisters and they visit the grave of Gene's father.
122	7	"The Demon Does the Holy Land"	July 5, 2011
Gene arranges for Nick, Shannon, and him to spend another few days in Israel where they sightsee including the Holocaust museum where Gene finds out about his parents' history.
123	8	"The Demon Salutes"	July 5, 2011
124	9	"Mr. Tweed Goes to Canada:Part 1"	July 12, 2011
Shannon takes Gene to visit her family in Saskatoon, Canada.
125	10	"Mr. Tweed Goes to Canada:Part 2"	July 12, 2011
Shannon takes Gene to visit her family in Saskatoon, Canada.
126	11	"The Kids Are Not Alright:Part 1"	July 19, 2011
Gene's therapist talks to him, Shannon, Nick, and Sophie about what has been going with their family while he is on tour with KISS.
127	12	"The Kids Are Not Alright:Part 2"	July 19, 2011
Gene's therapist talks to him, Shannon, Nick, and Sophie about what has been going with their family while he is on tour with KISS.
128	13	"Belize It or Not:Part 1"	July 26, 2011
Gene asks Shannon to marry him.
129	14	"Belize It or Not:Part 2"	July 26, 2011
Gene asks Shannon to marry him.
130	15	"The Answer:Part 1"	October 4, 2011
Shannon tells Gene that she will marry him.
131	16	"The Answer:Part 2"	October 4, 2011
Shannon tells Gene that she will marry him.
132	17	"Till Death Do Us Part:Part 1"	October 11, 2011
Shannon and Nick convince Gene to rethink his diet after he suffers from a head accident.
133	18	"Till Death Do Us Part:Part 2"	October 11, 2011
Shannon and Nick convince Gene to rethink his diet after he suffers from a head accident.
134	19	"Tracy the Wedding Planner:Part 1"	October 11, 2011
Tracy wants to be the wedding planner for Gene and Shannon but Shannon decides to hire a professional wedding planner.
135	20	"Tracy the Wedding Planner:Part 2"	October 11, 2011
Tracy wants to be the wedding planner for Gene and Shannon but Shannon decides to hire a professional wedding planner.
136	21	"Wedding Boot Camp:Part 1"	October 17, 2011
Shannon arranges for her and Gene to go to a marriage boot camp where they meet couples dealing with infidelity like them. Gene forgives his father for abandoning him and his mother just like Shannon forgives Gene for cheating.
137	22	"Wedding Boot Camp:Part 2"	October 17, 2011
Shannon arranges for her and Gene to go to a marriage boot camp where they meet couples dealing with infidelity like them. Gene forgives his father for abandoning him and his mother just like Shannon forgives Gene for cheating.
138	23	"Our Life Passes Before Us"	October 17, 2011
Gene and Shannon look back on their relationship and their future.
139	24	"Sleeping with the Boss"	October 17, 2011
Shannon wants to be Gene's business partner but Gene refuses to allow Shannon to partner with him in business.
140	25	"The Demon Says I Do?:Part 1"	October 18, 2011
It's Gene and Shannon's wedding day where Shannon, Sophie, Nick, and Gene perform as well as KISS who sings their hit song "Rock and Roll All Nite" at the reception.
141	26	"The Demon Says I Do?:Part 2"	October 18, 2011
It's Gene and Shannon's wedding day where Shannon, Sophie, Nick, and Gene perform as well as KISS who sings their hit song "Rock and Roll All Nite" at the reception.
142	27	"Post Wedding Special:Part 1"	October 18, 2011
Lynn Hoffman talks to the family a day after Gene and Shannon become Mr. and Mrs. Simmons.
143	28	"Post Wedding Special:Part 2"	October 18, 2011
Lynn Hoffman talks to the family a day after Gene and Shannon become Mr. and Mrs. Simmons.

=== Season 7 (2012) ===
No. overall	No. in season	Title	Original release date
144	1	"The Honeymoon Is Over :Part 1"	May 28, 2012
Gene and Shannon adjust to married life. Shannon wants to adopt a child, but Gene is reluctant.
145	2	"The Honeymoon Is Over :Part 2"	May 28, 2012
Gene and Shannon adjust to married life. Shannon wants to adopt a child, but Gene is reluctant.
146	3	"Starting Over"	June 4, 2012
Gene and Shannon continue to discuss adopting a child and Nick decides his future.
147	4	"The Adoption Plan"	June 4, 2012
Shannon mistakenly thinks Gene now wants to adopt, so she arranges for him to meet families with happy adoption stories. Meanwhile, Nick looks for a place to live.
148	5	"Where's Sophie?"	June 11, 2012
After Gene and Shannon confront Nick and Sophie about adopting, Sophie becomes upset and runs away.
149	6	"Cold Front"	June 11, 2012
Shannon travels to Whistler to find Sophie. In Whistler Shannon and Sophie have a showdown.
150	7	"Pregnant Pause"	June 18, 2012
Gene wants to go on a honeymoon with Shannon. Meanwhile, Tracy struggles with her baby plans.
151	8	"The Demon Must Be Crazy"	June 18, 2012
Gene and Shannon go on a honeymoon in Africa. While in Africa, Shannon hopes to get Gene's mind back on the subject of adoption.
152	9	"Gene's Other Children:Part 1"	June 25, 2012
Gene meets the African children whom he sponsors; Tracy prepares for in vitro fertilization.
153	10	"Gene's Other Children:Part 2"	June 25, 2012
Gene meets the African children whom he sponsors; Tracy prepares for in vitro fertilization.
154	11	"Baby on Board?:Part 1"	July 2, 2012
Gene and Shannon have trouble agreeing on whether they should adopt a child.
155	12	"Baby on Board?:Part 2"	July 2, 2012
Gene and Shannon have trouble agreeing on whether they should adopt a child.
156	13	"KISS A Vet"	July 9, 2012
Shannon poses for a pinup to help raise money for veterans; Gene performs at a benefit concert for vets.
157	14	"Old Habits Die Hard"	July 9, 2012
Shannon becomes concerned about Gene's loyalty when he announces that he's going on tour; Nick's dating habits worry Shannon.
158	15	"Attack of the Groupies"	July 9, 2012
Gene faces temptation while on tour in South America.
159	16	"Lost Phone"	July 14, 2012
Nick loses his phone and asks Sophie to help him find it.
160	17	"Demon Envy"	July 14, 2012
Gene scouts new talent at a music festival in Montreal.

== See also ==
- The Osbournes (2002)
- Hogan Knows Best (2005)
- Rock of Love with Bret Michaels (2007)
