= Karl Gajdusek =

American dramatist (born 1968)

- Born: 30 July 1968 (age 58); San Francisco, California, U.S.
- Occupation: Screenwriter
- Writing career
- Notable works: Oblivion (2013); Last Resort (2012–2013); The November Man (2014)

Karl Gajdusek (born 30 July 1968) is an American screenwriter, producer, and playwright. He was the showrunner for the first season of the Netflix series Stranger Things and the co-creator of the TV series Last Resort with Shawn Ryan. They were both also executive producers for the series. Gajdusek also wrote for the series Dead Like Me and wrote the film Trespass (2011). He co-wrote the screenplay for the 2013 Tom Cruise movie, Oblivion, and The November Man, which was released in 2014.

== Early life ==
Karl Gajdusek was born on 30 July 1968 in San Francisco, California, United States.

== Career ==
=== Film ===
Gajdusek's first professional break came through an option by independent producer Jeff Young for his screenplay Widow's Walk. Although the film would never be produced, Young's attempts to get the film made landed Gajdusek with his first agent. Gajdusek's next film, Higher was developed with director James Foley and later with director John McNaughton. For a period of time, Gajdusek teamed with screenwriter Michael Finch. Together they sold a number of pitches to various buyers including two to WWE Films. Their script based on the Bill Granger's The November Man novel, There Are No Spies, titled The November Man, first developed in 2009, began shooting in Belgrade in 2013 with Pierce Brosnan starring in the lead role. The film would finally premiere in 2014.

Meanwhile, Gajdusek wrote a solo feature script, Pandora, redefining him as a darker dramatic writer. After doing uncredited work on The Mechanic and the Liam Neeson film Unknown, Gajdusek wrote Trespass for Irwin Winkler which was released in 2011. Also in 2011, Gajdusek began work on two projects which would shape the direction of his career. The first was a screenplay based on the Rick Remender and Greg Toocchini graphic novel The Last Days of American Crime. Gajdusek claims it as one of his favorite pieces of writing. Director Olivier Megaton came on board in 2018 and the film premiered on Netflix in 2020.

Also in 2011, Gajdusek began work on a rewrite of the Joe Kosinski directed Oblivion. Gajdusek would work for almost a year on the film, through the casting of Tom Cruise and the switch from Disney Pictures to Universal Studios. Oblivion premiered in March 2013. In 2016, Gajdusek sold an original science fiction epic, Courage, to 20th Century Fox where it caught the attention of director Matthew Vaughan who became attached to direct. This partnership led to Gajdusek writing the script for a prequel in Vaughn's Kingsman franchise. That film wrapped shooting in May, 2019.

=== Television ===
Gajdusek landed his first job in television as a story editor on the second season of the Showtime series Dead Like Me. For Dead Like Me Gajdusek wrote on four episodes: "Haunted", "Death Defying", "Rites of Passage", and "The Shallow End". After the cancellation of the series, Gajdusek returned to screenwriting until he paired with Shawn Ryan in 2011 to co-create the ABC television series Last Resort which ran on ABC for a season in 2012.

In June, 2013, Gajdusek began to develop a science fiction television epic, The Spark for HBO. In August 2013, Gajdusek re-teamed with the Last Resort team of Shawn Ryan, Sony Pictures Television, and ABC to announce a new show, Freedom, about the rise of a hacktivist collective on the campus of an elite university. While Freedom did not survive at ABC, in 2014 Gajdusek paired with novelist Gary Shteyngart to adapt his novel Super Sad True Love Story into a television series with the production company MRC. In early 2015 this project was announced along with the attachment of Ben Stiller to direct many of the episodes.

In 2015, Gajdusek came on to the Netflix series Stranger Things as showrunner of the first season. In early 2016 it was announced that Super Sad True Love Story had been purchased by Showtime with Gajdusek and Shteyngart both as creators and executive producers. In 2017, Gajdusek was hired as Showrunner for the second season of Amazon's series about Zelda Fitzgerald: "Z: The Beginning of Everything."

==== List of film and television ====
- The Spark (TBA) (Television series—UCP)
- Freedom (TBA) (Television series for Sony TV/ABC)
- Super Sad True Love Story (TBA) (Television series at Showtime, MRC studios)
- The King's Man (2021) (screenplay)
- The Last Days of American Crime (2020)
- Blood Brother (2018)
- Stranger Things (2016)
- When the Bough Breaks (2016) (uncredited rewrite)
- The November Man (2014) (screenplay)
- Oblivion (2013) (screenplay)
- Last Resort (2012–2013) ABC series (co-creator, executive producer)
- Trespass (2011) (written by)

== Playwriting ==
Gajdusek's plays have been produced across the country and in New York. They include Greedy, FUBAR, Fair Game, Silverlake, North, Minneapolis, Dr.s F.s in the Terminal Ward, Big Sun Setting Fast, The Gilded Garden of Patcheww, Malibu, and Waco, Texas, Mon Amour. Attending Redwood High School in Marin County, California, Gajdusek was a member of The Ensemble Theatre Company of Marin which started him on a path of ensemble-based, avant-garde theater-making which lasted through his college years. Gajdusek's early plays were surreal and poetic in nature while his later work turned personal and naturalistic. Gajdusek has been a member of New Dramatists in New York and The Playwright's Center in Minneapolis. After finishing the play Greedy for Manhattan theater company Clubbed Thumb, Gajdusek temporarily stopped writing plays to focus on writing for the screen.

=== List of plays ===
- Waco, Texas, Mon Amour
- Malibu
- Minneapolis
- North
- Silverlake
- Fair Game
- FUBAR
- Greedy
- stranger things
