= The Clown (2000 AD) =

- Cover to 2000 AD #774, 1992; Art by Robert Bliss

Publication information
- Publisher: originally IPC Media (Fleetway) to 1999, thereafter Rebellion Developments
- First appearance: 2000 AD #774 (1992)
- Created by: Igor Goldkind; Robert Bliss

The Clown is a series published in the British comic anthology 2000 AD between 1992 and 1994. It was created by Igor Goldkind and Robert Bliss. The story is about a clown who goes on a violent rampage to avenge the decapitation of his pony Toby.

== Creation and concept ==
Igor Goldkind was originally hired to launch Crisis and later worked in PR for 2000 AD before eventually contributing one-off stories to both Crisis and Tharg's Future Shocks. He developed The Clown as a series for 2000 AD and intended it to be a fond parody of Neil Gaiman’s divisive literary writing style, describing it as “The Sandman on laughing gas”.

Goldkind portrays the Clown as an “existential Mr. Magoo [...] more fixated on his ideas about reality than reality itself” and credits The Sorrows of Young Werther as an inspiration for the series’s satirical, solipsistic "metaphysical slapstick".

== Publication history ==
- "The Clown Book 1" (in 2000 AD #774-779, 1992)
- "The Clown Book 2: Prologue" (in 2000 AD #841, 1993)
- "Vale of Tears" (with Greg Staples, in 2000 AD Yearbook 1994, 1993)
- "The Clown Book 2" (with Robert Bliss/Greg Staples/Nick Percival, in 2000 AD #881-888, 1994)

The first book was reprinted in Classic 2000 AD #10-11, 1996
