= Either You're In or You're in the Way =

2009 memoir written by Logan and Noah Miller

Either You're In or You're In The Way
- Author: Logan Miller; Noah Miller
- Language: English
- Genre: Non-fiction
- Publisher: HarperCollins
- Publication date: 2009
- Pages: 304
- ISBN: 978-0-06-176314-4

Either You're In or You're In The Way (2009) is a memoir written by Logan and Noah Miller. It was a San Francisco Chronicle non-fiction weekly bestseller in 2009. Logan and Noah Miller were featured on FORA.tv's Filmmaking on the Fly: Logan & Noah Miller.
