= Incarnate (comics) =

Comic book series by Nick Simmons

- Cover of Incarnate 1 (August 2009), art by Jo Chen

Publication information
- Publisher: Radical Comics
- Schedule: Monthly
- Format: Limited series
- Genre: Horror
- Publication date: August – December 2009
- No. of issues: 3

Creative team
- Created by: Nick Simmons
- Written by: Nick Simmons
- Artist(s): Assistant artists (from Studio IL); Nam Kim; Ben Harvey; Shi Hua Wong
- Penciller: Nick Simmons
- Inker: Matt Dalton
- Letterer: Rob Steen
- Colorist(s): Brian Buccellato; Dami Digital
- Editor: Tim Beedle

Collected editions
- Hardcover: ISBN 1-935417-02-9

Incarnate is a 3-issue comic book limited series created by Nick Simmons and published by American company Radical Comics. It was first published in August 2009.

== Publication history ==
The series was originally called Skullduggery and was due to be released in 2007 by IDW Publishing, who publish the Simmons Comic Group family of titles, headed by Nick's father Gene Simmons. However, this deal fell through because, according to Nick Simmons:

Well, first off, the art simply wasn't good enough. The people at IDW must have had the patience of saints to deal with the chicken scratch I turned in to them. My art was messy and juvenile. Amateur at best. I'm nowhere near pro now, to be sure, but I'm miles beyond what i used to be, especially in character design and overall neatness. And, with the help of Nam Kim and his team, the book has really turned into something I can be proud of.

Simmons was planning on continuing the series in some form, perhaps as a webcomic, but Radical Comics co-founder Barry Levine saw some art when negotiating a deal with Gene Simmons and offered to publish Incarnate, although he did tell Nick Simmons to start over. The series was then relaunched in mid-2009 with Radical holding a launch party at San Diego Comic-Con. The 3-issue mini-series was intended as the first part of a longer story: "I've always planned to make this a long-running series and it continues to evolve as I plan the second and third arcs". However, production was halted on the comic books and collected editions due to accusations of plagiarism.

== Plot summary ==
The comic book series is about a fictional species of creatures, Revenants. The Revenants are almost immortal as they can regenerate their bodies. The storyline focuses on a Revenant named Mot, who has lived for hundreds of years because of the Revenant’s regenerative capacity. Mot desires to die honorably on the battlefield for the Revenants, but can’t because they are almost immortal. However, when the “SANCTUM” organization finds a way to kill Revenants, Mot sees the avenue to his death.

== Controversy ==
Concerns were raised in late February 2010 that Nick Simmons had plagiarized character designs, fight scenes, plot segments, dialogue, poses and expressions from both professional and amateur artists, from several published manga (the most notable being Bleach), and from art communities such as DeviantArt.

Evelyn Dubocq, Senior Director of Public Relations at Viz Media, the American publisher of the Bleach manga, was quoted as saying "We appreciate all our fans bringing this matter to our attention, and we are currently investigating this issue". Tite Kubo, the author of Bleach, one of the manga specifically named, made two Twitter posts on the situation to comment on the number of people outside Japan commenting on the accusations, and noted that he was more concerned by the fact that Gene Simmons' son was a comic creator than he was concerned about his work being copied.

On February 25, 2010, the publisher of Incarnate, Radical Comics, announced on its official blog that it would be halting distribution and production of Incarnate until the matter is resolved between all concerned parties.

On March 1, 2010, Nick Simmons released the following statement regarding the accusations of plagiarism:

Like most artists I am inspired by work I admire. There are certain similarities between some of my work and the work of others. This was simply meant as an homage to artists I respect, and I definitely want to apologize to any Manga fans or fellow Manga artists who feel I went too far. My inspirations reflect the fact that certain fundamental imagery is common to all Manga. This is the nature of the medium. I am a big fan of Bleach, as well as other Manga titles. And I am certainly sorry if anyone was offended or upset by what they perceive to be the similarity between my work and the work of artists that I admire and who inspire me.”

In 2011, The New York Times stated that Radical Publishing was "forced to stop production" of the comic after the allegations of plagiarism.

== Cancelled collected editions ==
The series was due to be released as an individual volume in mid-2010, although its future relied on the publisher's investigations. Ultimately, no publication happened.

- Incarnate Volume 1 (162 pages, hardcover, May 2010, ISBN 1-935417-02-9, softcover, October 2010, ISBN 1-935417-36-3)
