= List of Eagle Award nominees and winners =

Comics award-related list

The following is a list winners and nominees (if available) of the Eagle Award, sorted by year that the award was presented. The Eagle Awards were first distributed in 1977 and were consistently presented in the 1980s and the 2000s (being mostly dormant in the 1990s). In 2014, in connection with Stan Lee, the Eagle Awards were renamed, and presented as, the True Believer Comic Awards. They have not returned since then.

== Past winners ==
=== 1977 ===
For comics published in 1976

Presented at the British Comic Art Convention on 3 September 1977, at the Bloomsbury Centre Hotel, London. Nominations in 19 categories:

==== Favourite Comicbook Artist ====
- Neal Adams (winner)
  - John Buscema (nominees)
  - Paul Gulacy
  - Barry Smith
  - Jim Starlin

==== Favourite British Comics Artist ====
- Frank Bellamy
  - Paul Neary
  - John Bolton

==== Favourite Comicbook Writer — U.S. ====
- Roy Thomas
  - Steve Englehart
  - Steve Gerber
  - tsaugmi obata

==== Favourite British Comics Writer ====
- Chris Claremont
  - Peter O'Donnell
  - Martin Lock

==== Favourite Comicbook - Dramatic ====
- X-Men
  - Master of Kung Fu
  - Warlock

==== Favourite Comicbook - Humour ====
- Howard the Duck
  - Plastic Man
  - Plop!

==== Favourite Dramatic Black & White Comics Magazine ====
- Savage Sword of Conan
  - Doc Savage
  - Marvel Preview

==== Favourite Black & White Comicbook - Humour ====
- MAD Magazine
  - Cracked
  - Crazy

==== Favourite Comic Publication All Time ====
- Fantastic Four
  - Conan
  - Spider-Man

==== Favourite Comicbook Character ====
- Conan the Barbarian
  - Howard the Duck
  - Warlock

==== Favourite British Comic Character ====
- Captain Britain
  - Garth
  - Modesty Blaise

==== Favourite Comicbook Team ====
- X-Men
  - Avengers
  - Defenders

==== Favourite New Comic Title ====
- Howard the Duck
  - Nova
  - Omega the Unknown

==== Favourite Single Comicbook Story ====
- Howard the Duck #3: "Four Feathers of Death" (Steve Gerber/John Buscema)
  - Fantastic Four #176: "Improbable as It May Seem the Impossible Man is Back in Town" (Roy Thomas/George Pérez)
  - Howard the Duck #1: "Howard the Barbarian" (Steve Gerber/Frank Brunner)

==== Favourite Continued Comic Story ====
- Master of Kung Fu #48-51 (Doug Moench/Paul Gulacy)
  - Defenders #31-40 + Annual #1 (Steve Gerber/Sal Buscema)
  - X-Men #98-100 (Chris Claremont/Dave Cockrum)

==== Favorite Professional British Comic Publication ====
- House of Hammer
  - Captain Britain
  - Garth
  - Brainstorm Comix

==== Favourite British Fan Publication ====
- Comic Media News
  - Comics Unlimited
  - Fantasy Advertiser International

==== Favourite British Fan Personality ====
- Martin Lock
  - Colin Campbell
  - Dez Skinn

==== Favourite Comics Creator All Time (a.k.a. Roll of Honour) ====
- Stan Lee
  - Jim Steranko
  - Jack Kirby

=== 1978 ===
Presented at the British Comic Art Convention, 29 July 1978, for comics released during 1977. Nominations in 21 categories.

==== Favourite Artist ====
- Neal Adams
  - John Byrne
  - Marshall Rogers
  - Jim Starlin

==== Favourite Writer ====
- Steve Englehart
  - Chris Claremont
  - Steve Gerber
  - Roy Thomas
  - Marv Wolfman

==== Favourite Comic Book (Dramatic) ====
- Uncanny X-Men
  - Avengers
  - Conan the Barbarian
  - Detective Comics

==== Favourite Black & White Magazine ====
- Savage Sword of Conan
  - Rampaging Hulk
  - Creepy
  - Eerie
  - Marvel Preview

==== Favourite New Artist ====
- Marshall Rogers
  - Mike Nasser
  - Michael Golden
  - Trevor von Eeden

==== Favourite Comic Book (Humour) ====
- Howard the Duck
  - MAD
  - Plastic Man
  - Cracked
  - Crazy

==== Favourite Inker ====
- Terry Austin
  - Ernie Chan
  - Klaus Janson
  - Tom Palmer
  - Joe Sinnott

==== Favourite Character ====
- Batman
  - Conan
  - Howard the Duck
  - Warlock
  - Wolverine

==== Favourite Villain ====
- Thanos
  - Scorpio
  - The Joker
  - Darkseid
  - Doctor Doom

==== Favourite Team ====
- X-Men
  - Defenders
  - Fantastic Four
  - Avengers
  - Justice Society of America

==== Favourite Supporting Character ====
- Pip the Troll
  - Beverly Switzler
  - Impossible Man
  - Vision
  - Wolverine

==== Character Most Worthy of Own Feature ====
- Silver Surfer
  - Warlock
  - Killraven
  - Man-Thing
  - Deathlok

==== Favourite Single Story ====
- Avengers Annual #7 – "The Final Threat" (Jim Starlin)
  - Detective Comics #472 – "I am the Batman" (Steve Englehart/Marshall Rogers)
  - Howard the Duck #16 – "The Zen and Art of Comic Book Writing" (Steve Gerber/Various artists)
  - Marvel Premiere #38 – "The Lord of Tyndall's Quest" (Doug Moench/Mike Ploog)
  - Marvel Preview #11 – "Starlord" (Chris Claremont/John Byrne)

==== Favourite Continued Story ====
- Avengers Annual #7/Marvel Two-in-One Annual #2 — "End of Warlock Saga" (Jim Starlin)
  - Star Wars #1-6 — "Film Adaptation" (George Lucas, Roy Thomas/Howard Chaykin)
  - X-Men #105, 107 & 108 — "Starjammers" (Chris Claremont/Dave Cockrum, John Byrne)
  - Detective Comics #471-472 — "Hugo Strange" (Steve Englehart/Marshall Rogers)
  - Defenders #46-50 — "Who Remembers Scorpio?" (David Anthony Kraft/Keith Giffen)

==== Favourite New Title ====
- John Carter, Warlord of Mars
  - Rampaging Hulk
  - Shade, the Changing Man
  - Star Hunters
  - Star Wars

==== Favourite British Pro Comics Publication ====
- Starburst
  - 2000 AD
  - House of Hammer
  - Captain Britain
  - Garth

==== Favourite Fan Publication ====
- Comic Media News
  - Bemusing
  - Panelologist
  - Fantasy Advertiser
  - Comics Unlimited

==== Favourite British Comics Character ====
- Judge Dredd
  - Captain Britain
  - Garth
  - Dan Dare
  - Walter the Wobot

==== Favourite British artist ====
- John Bolton
  - Brian Bolland
  - Dave Gibbons
  - Brian Lewis
  - Ian Gibson

==== Favourite British writer ====
- Martin Lock
  - Peter O'Donnell
  - John Wagner/Howard
  - Steve Parkhouse
  - Steve Moore

==== Roll of Honour ====
- Steve Englehart
  - Jim Steranko
  - Jack Kirby
  - Will Eisner
  - Howard the Duck

=== 1979 ===
For comics published in 1978. Presented at "Comicon '79," the British Comic Art Convention 11, Hotel Metropole, Birmingham, on September 1, 1979.

==== British Section ====
===== Favourite Comicbook Artist =====
- John Bolton
  - Brian Bolland
  - Ian Gibson
  - Dave Gibbons
  - Carlos Ezquerra

===== Favourite Comic Book Writer =====
- T. B. Grover (pseudonym of John Wagner)
  - Steve Parkhouse
  - John Howard
  - Pat Mills
  - Steve Moore

===== Favourite Pro Comics Publication =====
- 2000 AD
  - Starburst
  - Starlord
  - House of Hammer
  - Near Myths
  - Graphixus
  - Axa

===== Favourite Fan Publication =====
- Comic Media News
  - BEM
  - Graphic Sense
  - Vertigo
  - The Comic Review
  - Cerebro

===== Favourite Character =====
- Judge Dredd
  - Strontium Dog
  - Dan Dare
  - Robo-Hunter
  - Ro-Jaws
  - Axa
  - Luther Arkwright
  - Modesty Blaise

==== American Section ====
===== Favourite Comicbook Artist =====
- John Byrne
  - Marshall Rogers
  - George Pérez
  - Michael Golden
  - Gene Colan

===== Favourite Comic Book Writer =====
- Chris Claremont
  - Steve Englehart
  - Roy Thomas
  - Steve Gerber
  - Doug Moench

===== Favourite Inker =====
- Terry Austin
  - Tom Palmer
  - Bob Layton
  - Klaus Janson
  - Joe Sinnott

===== Favourite Comic Magazine =====
- X-Men
  - The Avengers
  - Detective Comics
  - The Tomb of Dracula
  - Jonah Hex

===== Favourite Comic Magazine =====
- Savage Sword of Conan
  - Marvel Preview
  - The Rampaging Hulk
  - Heavy Metal
  - 1984

===== Favourite Comic Book Character =====
- Batman
  - Wolverine
  - Howard the Duck
  - Conan
  - Spider-Man
  - Doctor Strange

===== Favourite Comic Book Group =====
- X-Men
  - The Avengers
  - Fantastic Four
  - Defenders
  - Legion of Super-Heroes

===== Favourite Comic Book Villain =====
- Magneto
  - The Joker
  - Doctor Doom
  - Michael Korvac
  - Doctor Bong
  - Death-Stalker

===== Favourite Supporting Character =====
- Wolverine
  - Beast
  - Vision
  - Nightcrawler
  - Beverly Switzler
  - Hawkeye

===== Character Most Worthy of His Own Feature =====
- The Silver Surfer
  - Warlock
  - Jack of Hearts
  - Killraven
  - Deathlok

===== Favourite Single Story =====
- X-Men #111 – "Mindgames" (Chris Claremont/John Byrne)
  - The Avengers #178 – "The Martyr Perplex" (Steve Gerber/Carmine Infantino)
  - Superman vs. Muhammad Ali (Denny O'Neil/Neal Adams)
  - The Avengers #177 – "The Hope and the Slaughter" (Jim Shooter/David Wenzel)
  - X-Men #109 – "Home are the Heroes" (Chris Claremont/John Byrne)

===== Best Continued Story =====
- The Avengers #167, 168, 170-177 (Jim Shooter/George Pérez, Sal Buscema, David Wenzel)
  - X-Men #114-116 (Chris Claremont/John Byrne)
  - Captain Marvel #58-62 (Doug Moench/Pat Broderick)
  - Detective Comics #475-476 (Steve Englehart/Marshall Rogers)
  - Thor #272-278 (Roy Thomas/John Buscema)
  - X-Men #111-113 (Chris Claremont/John Byrne)

===== Favourite Cover =====
- Master of Kung Fu #67 (Paul Gulacy)
  - Detective Comics #476 (Marshall Rogers)
  - X-Men #114 (John Byrne)
  - X-Men #111 (John Byrne)
  - X-Men #113 (John Byrne)

==== Roll of Honour ====
- Jack Kirby
  - Will Eisner
  - Jerry Siegel and Joe Shuster
  - Steve Gerber
  - Superman

=== 1980 ===
For comics published in 1979.

==== American section ====
===== Favourite Comicbook Artist =====
- John Byrne
  - George Pérez
  - John Buscema
  - Gene Colan

===== Favourite Writer =====
- Chris Claremont
  - Doug Moench
  - David Michelinie

===== Favourite Inker =====
- Terry Austin
  - Bob Layton
  - Tom Palmer

===== Favourite Comicbook =====
- X-Men
  - Avengers
  - Master of Kung Fu

===== Favourite Magazine =====
- Howard the Duck
  - Savage Sword of Conan
  - Marvel Preview

===== Favourite Comicbook Character =====
- Wolverine
  - Batman
  - Spider-Man

===== Favourite Group or Team =====
- X-Men
  - Avengers
  - Fantastic Four

===== Favourite Villain =====
- Magneto
  - Arcade
  - Joker

===== Favourite Supporting Character =====
- Beast
  - Wolverine
  - Vision

===== Character Most Worthy of Own Book =====
- Warlock
  - Silver Surfer
  - Killraven

===== Favourite Single Comicbook Story =====
- Iron Man #128 – Demon in a Bottle (David Michelinie, Bob Layton/John Romita Jr)
  - X-Men Annual #3 – A Fire in the Sky (Chris Claremont/George Pérez)
  - Marvel Two-in-One #51 – Full House, Dragons High (Peter B. Gillis/Frank Miller)

===== Favourite Continued Comic Story =====
- X-Men #125-128 (Chris Claremont/John Byrne)
  - Marvel Two-in-One #53-58 (Mark Gruenwald, Ralph Macchio/John Byrne, George Pérez)
  - Micronauts #1-12 (Bill Mantlo/Michael Golden)

===== Favourite New Comic Title =====
- Howard the Duck
  - Rom
  - Time Warp

===== Favourite Cover =====
- The Avengers #185 (George Pérez)
  - Micronauts #7 (Michael Golden)
  - Iron Man #128 (John Romita Jr)

===== Favourite Fan Publication =====
- The Comics Journal
  - The Comic Reader
  - Mediascene

==== British Section ====
===== Favourite Comicbook Artist (UK) =====
- Brian Bolland
  - John Bolton
  - Ron Smith

===== Favourite Writer =====
- John Howard
  - Steve Parkhouse
  - T.B. Grover

===== Favourite Inker =====
- Brian Bolland (Note: "The award went to John Stokes in second place, as Brian Bolland did not feel he was eligible for it in 1979.")
  - John Stokes
  - Gary Leach

===== Favourite Comic =====
- 2000 AD
  - Doctor Who Weekly
  - Hulk Weekly

===== Favourite Magazine =====
- 2000 AD Summer Special
  - Near Myths

===== Favourite Character =====
- Judge Dredd
  - Black Knight
  - Night Raven

===== Favourite Group or Team =====
- Ro-Busters
  - The VC's
  - ABC Warriors

===== Favourite Villain =====
- Judge Cal
  - Mekon
  - Modred

===== Favourite Supporting Character =====
- Ro-Jaws
  - Walter the Wobot
  - Zog
  - Commander Kidd

===== Character Most Worthy of Own Book =====
- Judge Dredd
  - Captain Britain
  - Night Raven

===== Favourite Single Story =====
- Hulk Weekly #2 (Night Raven)
  - 2000 AD 137 ("Death of a Judge")
  - 2000 AD 145 ("Umpty Candy")
  - 2000 AD 127 ("Night of the Ripper")

===== Favourite Continued Story =====
- Hulk Weekly 1–30, 42, 43 (Black Knight)
  - 2000 AD 140–151 ("Stainless Steel Rat")
  - 2000 AD 104–118 ("Strontium Dog: Journey Into Hell")

===== Favourite New Title =====
- Doctor Who Weekly
  - Tornado

===== Favourite Cover =====
- 2000 AD 144
  - 2000 AD 113
  - 2000 AD 134

===== Favourite Fan Publication =====
- BEM
  - Cerebro
  - Comics Unlimited
  - Graphic Sense

==== Roll of Honour ====
- Roy Thomas
  - Will Eisner
  - Jerry Siegel and Joe Shuster
  - Steve Gerber

=== 1981 ===
For comics published in 1980.

==== American section ====
===== Favourite Comic Book Artist =====
- John Byrne
  - Frank Miller
  - George Pérez
  - Jim Starlin
  - Michael Golden

===== Favourite Comics Book Writer =====
- Chris Claremont
  - Doug Moench
  - David Michelinie
  - Marv Wolfman
  - Frank Miller

===== Favourite Comic Book Inker =====
- Terry Austin
  - Bob Layton
  - Klaus Janson
  - Gene Day
  - Joe Sinnott

===== Favourite Comic Book =====
- X-Men
  - Daredevil
  - The New Teen Titans
  - Master of Kung Fu
  - Iron Man

===== Favourite Comic Magazine =====
- Epic Illustrated
  - Marvel Preview/Bizarre Adventures
  - Savage Sword of Conan
  - Heavy Metal
  - Howard the Duck

===== Favourite Comic Book Character =====
- Wolverine
  - Daredevil
  - Batman
  - Phoenix
  - Iron Man

===== Favourite Group or Team =====
- X-Men
  - The New Teen Titans
  - The Avengers
  - Fantastic Four
  - The Micronauts

===== Favourite Comic Book Villain =====
- Magneto
  - Doctor Doom
  - The Joker
  - Dark Phoenix
  - Arcade

===== Favourite Supporting Character =====
- Wolverine
  - Beast
  - Nightcrawler
  - Bethany Cabe
  - Hawkeye

===== Character Most Worthy of Own Book =====
- Silver Surfer
  - Wolverine
  - Warlock
  - Killraven
  - Captain Marvel

===== Favourite Single Comic Book Story =====
- X-Men #137 "The Fate of the Phoenix"
  - Daredevil #163 "Blind Alley"
  - X-Men #138 "Elegy"
  - Daredevil #164 "Exposé"
  - Captain America #250 "Cap for President"

===== Favourite Continued Comic Book Story =====
- X-Men #135–137, "The Dark Phoenix Saga"
  - X-Men #129–138 "Hellfire Club/Dark Phoenix"
  - X-Men #129–134 "Hellfire Club"
  - Iron Man #131–133 "Iron Man vs. the Hulk"
  - Epic Illustrated #1–4 "Metamorphosis Odyssey

===== Favourite New Comic Book Title =====
- The New Teen Titans
  - Moon Knight
  - Epic Illustrated
  - Dazzler
  - Ka-Zar

===== Favourite Comic Book Cover =====
- X-Men #136 (John Byrne/Terry Austin)
  - X-Men #137
  - X-Men #130
  - X-Men 140

===== Favourite Fan Publication =====
- The Comics Journal
  - Comics Feature
  - The Comic Reader

==== British Section ====
===== Favourite Artist =====
- Brian Bolland
  - John Bolton
  - Dave Gibbons
  - Mike McMahon
  - Carlos Ezquerra

===== Favourite Writer =====
- T.B. Grover (John Wagner)
  - John Wagner
  - John Howard (John Wagner)
  - Steve Parkhouse
  - Steve Moore

===== Favourite Comic =====
- 2000 AD
  - Doctor Who Weekly
  - Battle
  - The Beano

===== Favourite Comic Magazine =====
- Doctor Who Monthly
  - Near Myths
  - 2000 AD Sci-Fi Special

===== Favourite Character =====
- Judge Dredd
  - Doctor Who
  - Strontium Dog
  - Robo-Hunter
  - Night Raven Marvel UK

===== Favourite Group or Team =====
- The VC's (2000 AD)
  - Ro-Busters
  - ABC Warriors
  - Bash Street Kids
  - Star Tigers Doctor Who Weekly

===== Favourite Villain =====
- Judge Death
  - Torquemada
  - Star Beast Doctor Who Weekly
  - Leeshar
  - Modred

===== Favourite Supporting Character =====
- Hoagy (Robo-Hunter)
  - Wulf Sternhammer
  - The Gronk
  - Judge Anderson
  - Judge Hershey

===== Character Most Worthy of Own Book =====
- Judge Dredd
  - Captain Britain
  - Strontium Dog
  - Robo-Hunter
  - Night-Raven

===== Favourite Single Story =====
- "Terror Tube" 2000 AD #167
  - Judge Dredd — "Return to Mega-City One" 2000 AD 182
  - Judge Dredd — "An Alien Tale" 2000 AD 163
  - "Tharg Saves the Day" 2000 AD 182
  - Strontium Dog — "Mutie's Luck" 2000 AD 189
  - Doctor Who 46

===== Favourite Continued Story =====
- Judge Dredd — "The Judge Child," 2000 AD #156–181
  - Robo-Hunter — "Day of the Droids" 2000 AD 152–174
  - Judge Dredd — "Judge Death" 2000 AD 149–151
  - Meltdown Man
  - Return to Armageddon

===== Favourite Cover =====
- 2000 AD #173 (Judge Dredd) by Brian Bolland
  - 2000 AD #169 (Judge Dredd)
  - 2000 AD #164 (Judge Dredd)
  - 2000 AD #182 (Judge Dredd)
  - 2000 AD #175 (Robo-Warrior)

===== Favourite Fan Publication =====
- BEM
  - Cerebro
  - The Owl's Effort
  - Fantasy Forum
  - Cygnus Alpha
  - Ogre

==== Roll of Honor ====
- Jerry Siegel and Joe Shuster
  - John Byrne
  - Will Eisner
  - Chris Claremont
  - Phoenix/Jean Grey

=== 1982 ===
The Eagle Awards were not presented or distributed in 1982 (except for possibly the Roll of Honour).

==== Roll of Honour ====
- Mick Austin

=== 1983 ===
For comics published in 1982; awards presented 15 October 1983 at the London Comic Mart, Central Hall, Westminster, by Alan Moore and Dave Gibbons.

==== American section ====
===== Favourite Comic Book Writer =====
- Frank Miller
  - Bruce Jones

===== Favourite Comic Book Artist (Penciler) =====
- Frank Miller
  - Brent Anderson

===== Favourite Inker =====
- Terry Austin

===== Favourite Comic Book =====
- Daredevil
  - Raw

===== Favourite Character =====
- Wolverine
  - Daredevil

===== Favourite Group or Team =====
- X-Men

===== Favourite Villain =====
- Darkseid

===== Favourite Supporting Character =====
- Elektra

===== Character Most Worthy of Own Title =====
- Spectre
  - Bullseye
  - Plastic Man

===== Favourite Single or Continued Story =====
- Wolverine #1-4 (limited series)

===== Favourite New Comic Title =====
- Camelot 3000

===== Favourite Comic Cover =====
- Doctor Strange #55 (Michael Golden)

===== Favourite Specialist Comics Publication =====
- [PASS]
  - Amazing Heroes
  - The Comic Reader
  - The Comics Journal

==== British Section ====
===== Favourite Comicbook Writer =====
- Alan Moore

===== Favourite Comicbook Artist =====
- Brian Bolland

===== Favourite Comic =====
- Warrior — "V for Vendetta"

===== Favourite Comic Character =====
- Marvelman

===== Favourite Villain =====
- Kid Marvelman

===== Favourite Supporting Character =====
- Zirk (Warrior)

===== Character Most Worthy of Own Title =====
- Judge Anderson

===== Favourite Single or Continued Story =====
- Marvelman (Warrior #1-3, 5 & 6)

===== Favourite New Comic =====
- Warrior

===== Favourite Comic Cover =====
- Warrior #7 (Mick Austin)

===== Favourite Specialist Comics Publication =====
- [PASS]

==== Roll of Honour ====
- Will Eisner
  - Neal Adams
  - Harvey Kurtzman

=== 1984 ===
The 1984 awards (for comics published in 1983) were announced/presented at the Birmingham Comic Art Show, on Saturday, June 2, 1984.

London Comic Mart, Central Hall Westminster, on Saturday, June 2, 1984

==== American section ====
===== Favourite Penciler =====
- Howard Chaykin
  - Brian Bolland
  - José Luis García-López

===== Favourite Inker =====
- Howard Chaykin
  - Terry Austin
  - Dick Giordano

===== Favourite Writer =====
- Howard Chaykin
  - Mike Baron
  - Marv Wolfman

===== Favourite Comic =====
- American Flagg!
  - Legion of Super-Heroes
  - Love and Rockets

===== Favourite Character =====
  - Batman
  - Nexus
  - Reuben Flagg

===== Favourite Group or Team =====
  - Blackhawks
  - Legion of Super-Heroes
  - Teen Titans

===== Favourite Villain =====
  - Belasco
  - The Joker
  - Morgan le Fey

===== Favourite Supporting Character =====
- Raul the cat
  - Beta Ray Bill
  - Tyrone

===== Character Most Worthy of Own Title/Series =====
  - Hawkman
  - The Rocketeer
  - Spectre

===== Favourite Single or Continued Story =====
- American Flagg! #1–2, "Hard Times"
  - Love and Rockets #2, "Mechanics"
  - Night Force #8–10, "Beast"

===== Favourite New Comic Title =====
- American Flagg!
  - Jon Sable
  - Nexus

===== Favourite Comic Cover =====
  - American Flagg! #2, "Back in the U.S.A." (Howard Chaykin)
  - American Flagg! #3, "Killed in the Ratings" (Howard Chaykin)
  - Camelot 3000 #9, "Grailquest 3000" (Brian Bolland)

===== Favourite Special Comics Publication =====
  - Comics Interview
  - The Comics Journal
  - The Comic Reader

==== British Section ====
===== Favourite Artist =====
  - Alan Davis
  - Garry Leach
  - Mike McMahon

===== Favourite Writer =====
- Pat Mills
  - Alan Moore
  - John Wagner

===== Favourite Comic =====
- The Daredevils
  - 2000 AD
  - Warrior

===== Favourite Character =====
  - Judge Dredd
  - Marvelman
  - V

==== Roll of Honor ====
  - Harvey Kurtzman
  - Julius Schwartz
  - Alex Toth

=== 1985 ===
For comics released in 1984.

==== British Section ====
===== Favourite Artist =====
- Alan Davis
  - Mike McMahon
  - David Lloyd

===== Favourite Writer =====
- Alan Moore
  - Pat Mills
  - John Wagner

===== Favourite Comic Book =====
- Warrior, edited by Dez Skinn (Quality Communications)
  - 2000 AD
  - The Mighty World of Marvel

===== Favourite Character =====
- Judge Dredd
  - Marvelman
  - V

===== Favourite Group =====
- Mega City Judges
  - The Bojeffries Saga
  - Special Executive

===== Favourite Villain =====
- Torquemada, from Nemesis the Warlock (2000 AD), by Pat Mills and Brian Talbot (Fleetway)
  - Fury
  - Dr. Gargunza

===== Favourite Supporting Character =====
- Evey
  - Pulger
  - Chrysoprasia

===== Character Most Worthy of Own Title =====
- D.R. & Quinch
  - Marvelman
  - The Spider

===== Favourite Story =====
- 2000 AD #55–359
  - Warrior #18–24
  - 2000 AD #352–360

===== Favourite New Title =====
- Captain Britain
  - Conqueror

===== Favourite Cover =====
- Warrior #19 by David Lloyd and Garry Leach
  - The Mighty World of Marvel #12 by Alan Davis
  - Warrior #18 by Steve Parkhouse

===== Favourite Speciality Comics Publication =====
- Fantasy Advertiser
  - Escape
  - Comics News Monthly

==== North American section ====
===== Favourite Artist =====
- Bill Sienkiewicz
  - Howard Chaykin
  - Jaime Hernandez

===== Favourite Inker =====
- Terry Austin
  - John Totleben
  - Howard Chaykin

===== Favourite Writer =====
- Alan Moore
  - Howard Chaykin
  - Gilbert Hernandez

===== Favourite Comic Book =====
- Swamp Thing
  - American Flagg!
  - Love and Rockets

===== Favourite Character =====
- Reuben Flagg
  - Batman
  - Maggie

===== Favourite Group =====
- Teen Titans
  - Power Pack
  - Atari Force

===== Favourite Villain =====
- Doctor Doom
  - The Joker
  - Darkseid

===== Favourite Supporting Character =====
- Raul (the cat)
  - Luther Ironheart
  - Maggie

==== Character Most Worthy of Own Title ====
- The Spectre
  - The Shadow
  - Herbie

===== Favourite Story =====
- Superman #400
  - Machine Man #1–3
  - Love and Rockets #5

===== Favourite New Title =====
- Power Pack, written by Louise Simonson (Marvel Comics)
  - Strange Days
  - Mister X

===== Favourite Cover =====
- New Mutants #22 by Bill Sienkiewicz
  - American Flagg! #8 by Howard Chaykin
  - Mister X #1 by Brendan McCarthy

===== Favourite Speciality Publication =====
- Amazing Heroes
  - The Comics Journal
  - Comics Interview

==== Roll of Honour ====
- Steve Ditko
  - Joe Kubert
  - Superman

=== 1986 ===
Awards for comics released during 1985 were presented on Sunday, June 1, 1986, at The Birmingham Comic Art Show. The winners were:

==== British Section ====
===== Favourite Artist =====
- Alan Davis
  - Ian Gibson
  - Glenn Fabry

===== Favourite Writer =====
- Alan Moore
  - Pat Mills
  - Jamie Delano

===== Favourite Comic =====
- 2000 AD
  - Captain Britain
  - Escape

===== Favourite Comic Album =====
- Nemesis Book III
  - Judge Dredd Annual 1986
  - 2000 AD Annual 1986

===== Favourite Comic Character =====
- Halo Jones
  - Judge Dredd
  - Captain Britain

===== Favourite Villain =====
- Torquemada
  - Judge Death
  - Slaymaster

===== Favourite Supporting Character =====
- Meggan (Captain Britain)
  - Ukko the Dwarf (Slaine)
  - Judge Anderson

===== Character Most Worthy of Own Title =====
- Halo Jones
  - V for Vendetta
  - D.R. and Quinch

===== Favourite Single or Continued Story =====
- Halo Jones Book Two (2000 AD #406-415)
  - Midnight Surfer (Judge Dredd, 2000 AD #424-429)
  - DR and Quinch Get Back to Nature (2000 AD Summer Special)

===== Favourite New Comic =====
- Captain Britain
  - The Best of 2000 AD
  - Swiftsure

===== Favourite Comic Cover =====
- Captain Britain #6
  - Captain Britain #8
  - 2000 AD #450

===== Favourite Specialist Comics Publication =====
- Speakeasy
  - Fantasy Advertiser
  - Arkensword

==== American section ====
===== Favourite Artist (penciller) =====
- George Pérez
  - Art Adams
  - John Byrne

===== Favourite Artist (inker) =====
- Terry Austin
  - John Totleben
  - Jerry Ordway

===== Favourite Writer =====
- Alan Moore
  - Chris Claremont
  - Marv Wolfman

===== Favourite Comic Book =====
- Swamp Thing
  - Crisis on Infinite Earths
  - X-Men

===== Favourite Graphic Novel =====
- American Flagg!: Hard Times
  - She-Hulk
  - Raven Banner

===== Favourite Character =====
- Batman
  - Wolverine
  - Swamp Thing

===== Favourite Group or Team =====
- X-Men
  - Teen Titans
  - Fantastic Four

===== Favourite Villain =====
- Anti-Monitor
  - The Joker
  - Kingpin

===== Favourite Supporting Character =====
- John Constantine (Swamp Thing)
  - Abby Cable (Swamp Thing)
  - Raul the Cat (American Flagg!)

===== Character Most Worthy of Own Title =====
- Wolverine
  - Longshot
  - Green Arrow

===== Favourite Single or Continued Story =====
- Crisis on Infinite Earths #1-9
  - X-Men Annual #9/New Mutants Special #1
  - "American Gothic" in Swamp Thing #37

===== Favourite New Comic Title =====
- Miracleman
  - Crisis on Infinite Earths
  - Moonshadow

===== Favourite Comic Cover =====
- Swamp Thing #34
  - Crisis on Infinite Earths #7
  - New Mutants Special #1

===== Favourite Specialist Comics Publication =====
- Amazing Heroes
  - The Comics Journal
  - Comics Interview

==== Roll of Honour ====
- Alan Moore
  - Dick Giordano
  - Frank Miller

=== 1987 ===
The 1986 results were presented on Saturday, September 5, 1987, at UKCAC87, The Institute of Education, London WC1. The winners were:

==== British Section ====
- Favourite Artist: Alan Davis
- Favourite Writer: Alan Moore
- Favourite Comic: 2000 AD
- Favourite Comic Album: D.R. and Quinch's Totally Awesome Guide to Life
- Favourite Character: Judge Dredd
- Favourite Villain: Torquemada
  - (nominee): Zebethyial (Redfox)
- Favourite Supporting Character: Ukko the Dwarf (from Sláine)
- Character Most Worthy of Own Title: Captain Britain
  - (nominee): Lyssa (Redfox)
- Favourite Single or Continued Story: Halo Jones Book Three
- Favourite New Comic: Redfox
- Favourite Comic Cover: 2000 AD #500
- Favourite Specialist Comics Publication: Speakeasy

==== American section ====
- Favourite Artist (penciller): Frank Miller
- Favourite Artist (inker): Terry Austin
- Favourite Writer: Alan Moore
- Favourite Comicbook: Watchmen
- Favourite Graphic Novel: Batman: The Dark Knight Returns
- Favourite Character: Batman
- Favourite Group or Team: X-Men
- Favourite Villain: The Joker
- Favourite Supporting Character: John Constantine
- Character Most Worthy of Own Title: Wolverine
- Favourite Single or Continued Story: Batman: The Dark Knight Returns
- Favourite New Comic Title: Watchmen
- Favourite Comic Cover: Batman: The Dark Knight Returns #1
- Favourite Specialist Comics Publication: Amazing Heroes

==== Roll of Honour ====
- Frank Miller

=== 1988 ===
The Awards for comics released during 1987 were presented on Saturday, September 24, 1988, at UKCAC88, The Institute of Education, London WC1. The winners were:

==== British Section ====
- Favourite Artist: Bryan Talbot
- Favourite Writer: Pat Mills
- Favourite Comic: 2000 AD
- Favourite Comic Album: Violent Cases
- Favourite Character: Luther Arkwright
- Favourite Villain: Torquemada (Nemesis the Warlock)
- Favourite Supporting Character: Ukko the Dwarf (Sláine)
- Character Most Worthy of Own Title: Halo Jones
- Favourite Single or Continued Story: Zenith (2000 AD #535-550)
- Favourite New Comic: The Adventures of Luther Arkwright
- Favourite Comic Cover: The Adventures of Luther Arkwright #1 (Bryan Talbot)
- Favourite Specialist Comics Publication: Speakeasy

==== American Section ====
- Favourite Artist (penciller): Bill Sienkiewicz
- Favourite Artist (inker): Terry Austin
- Favourite Writer: Alan Moore
- Favourite Comicbook: Watchmen
- Favourite Graphic Novel: Daredevil: Love and War
- Favourite Character: Batman
- Favourite Group or Team: Justice League International
- Favourite Villain: The Joker
- Favourite Supporting Character: Abigail Arcane Cable
- Character Most Worthy of Own Title: Rorschach
- Favourite Single or Continued Story: Batman #404-407: Year One
- Favourite New Comic Title: Marshal Law
- Favourite Comic Cover: Wonder Woman #10
- Favourite Specialist Comics Publication: Amazing Heroes

==== Roll of Honour ====
- Pat Mills

=== 1990 ===
The results for 1989 were presented at the 1990 United Kingdom Comic Art Convention (UKCAC) on September 23 by Paul Gambaccini and Dave Gibbons. The winners were:

- Roll of Honour: 2000 AD
- Best International Comic Book: Akira

==== British Section ====
- Favourite Artist: Simon Bisley
- Favourite Writer: Grant Morrison
- Favourite Comic: 2000 AD
- Favourite Graphic Novel: Sláine: The Horned God Book I
- Favourite Character: Judge Dredd
- Favourite Villain: Judge Death
- Favourite Supporting Character: Middenface McNulty (Strontium Dog)
- Favourite Single or Continued Story: Sláine: The Horned God Book I (2000 AD #626-635)
- Favourite New Comic: The Bogie Man
- Favourite Comic Cover: 2000 AD Prog 626
- Favourite Specialist Comics Publication: Speakeasy

==== American Section ====
- Favourite Writer: Neil Gaiman, Sandman (DC)
- Favourite Artist (Penciller): Todd McFarlane
- Favourite Artist (Inker): Paul Neary
- Favourite Comicbook: Uncanny X-Men
- Favourite Graphic Novel: Arkham Asylum: A Serious House on Serious Earth
- Favourite Character: Batman
- Favourite Group or Team: Doom Patrol
- Favourite Villain: The Joker
- Character Most Worthy of Own Title: Captain Britain
- Favourite Single or Continued Story: Skreemer
- Favourite New Comic Title: Batman: Legends of the Dark Knight
- Favourite Comic Cover: Aliens #1 by Denis Beauvais
- Favourite Specialist Comics Publication: Marvel Age
  - 2nd place: The Comics Journal

=== 1997 ===
Best Newcomer: Alex Ronald

=== 2000 ===
==== British Section ====
===== Favourite British Comic =====
(Sponsored by Comic Book Postal Auctions)

- 2000 AD
  - The Beano
  - Judge Dredd Megazine
  - Viz
  - Warhammer

===== Favourite Comic Strip in a UK Comic or Magazine =====
- Judge Dredd (2000 AD/Judge Dredd Megazine)
  - Action Man (Action Man Monthly)
  - Doctor Who (Doctor Who Magazine)
  - Nikolai Dante (2000 AD)
  - Sinister Dexter (2000 AD)

===== Favourite UK Non-newsstand Title =====
(Sponsored by Red Route)

- Kane, by Paul Grist
  - Class of '79
  - O-Men
  - Sleaze Castle
  - Strangehaven

==== North American Section ====
The following award nominations cover creators and work published in the U.S. and Canada only (irrespective of the country of origin of the work or the nationality of its creators), with nominations based purely on work published in 1999:

===== Favourite Colour Comicbook =====
(Sponsored by Quality Comics)

- 1999: Preacher, by Garth Ennis and Steve Dillon
  - JLA
  - Transmetropolitan
  - Acme Novelty Library
  - Avengers

===== Favourite Black & White Comicbook =====
(Sponsored by Page 45)

- Sin City: Hell & Back, by Frank Miller
  - Strangers in Paradise
  - Cerebus
  - Bone
  - Torso

===== Favourite New Comicbook of 1999 =====
(Sponsored by Dynamic Forces)

- Top 10, by Alan Moore and Gene Ha
  - The Authority
  - Heart of Empire
  - Planetary
  - Rising Stars

==== International Section ====
===== Favourite Comics Writer =====
- Alan Moore
  - Kurt Busiek
  - Warren Ellis
  - Garth Ennis
  - Grant Morrison

===== Favourite Comics Artist (penciller) =====
- George Pérez
  - Steve Dillon
  - Bryan Hitch
  - Frank Quitely
  - Bryan Talbot

===== Favourite Comic Book Artist (inker) =====
- Jimmy Palmiotti
  - Terry Austin
  - Mark Farmer
  - Mick Gray
  - Paul Neary

===== Favourite Comics Artist (painted artwork) =====
- Alex Ross
  - Dan Brereton
  - John Burns
  - Glenn Fabry
  - David Mack

===== Favourite Comics Artist (colouring) =====
- Laura DePuy Martin
  - Matt Hollingsworth
  - Liquid!
  - Angus McKie
  - Lynn Varley

===== Favourite Comics Editor =====
- Denny O'Neil
  - David Bishop
  - Tom Brevoort
  - Scott Dunbier
  - Bob Harras

===== Favourite Comic (excluding North American and UK titles) =====
(Sponsored by Knockabout Comics)

- Bacchus, by Eddie Campbell (Australia)
  - Comix 2000 (France)
  - Dylan Dog (Italy)
  - Lapin (France)
  - Pokémon (Japan)

===== Favourite Comics Character =====
(Sponsored by David's Comics)

- Batman, created by Bob Kane
  - Cerebus, created by Dave Sim
  - Jesse Custer (Preacher), created by Garth Ennis and Steve Dillon
  - Spider Jerusalem (Transmetropolitan), created by Warren Ellis and Darick Robertson
  - Superman, created by Jerry Siegel and Joe Shuster

===== Favourite Comics Story (which appeared, began or ended during 1999) =====
(Sponsored by Quality Comics)

- Daredevil (#1-8), by Kevin Smith and Joe Quesada
  - No Man's Land
  - Heart of Empire
  - Avengers Forever
  - The Inhumans
  - Sam and Twitch (#1-7: Udaku)

===== Character Most Worthy of Own Ongoing Title =====
- Luther Arkwright (Heart of Empire)
  - The Huntress (Batman)
  - Hal Jordan (Green Lantern)
  - Jenny Sparks (The Authority)
  - Storm (The X-Men)

===== Favourite Supporting Character =====
- Oracle/Barbara Gordon (Batman/Birds of Prey)
  - Alfred Pennyworth (Batman)
  - Cassidy (Preacher)
  - Tulip O'Hare (Preacher)
  - Plastic Man (JLA)

===== Favourite Cover Published During 1999 =====
- Batman: Harley Quinn by Alex Ross
  - Batman: War on Crime
  - 2000 AD Prog 2000
  - Daredevil #9
  - The Inhumans #11

===== Favourite Comics Villain =====
(Sponsored by B-Hive Ltd.)

- Herr Starr (Preacher)
  - Doctor Doom (Fantastic Four)
  - Joker (Batman)
  - Lex Luthor (Superman)
  - Magneto (X-Men)

===== Favourite Graphic Novel =====
(Sponsored by Diamond Comic Distributors)

- JLA: Earth 2, by Grant Morrison and Frank Quitely
  - Sandman: The Dream Hunters
  - Batman: War on Crime
  - Good-Bye, Chunky Rice
  - You Are Here

===== Favourite Trade Paperback =====
- From Hell: To Hell, by Alan Moore and Eddie Campbell
  - Batman: The Long Halloween
  - Crisis on Infinite Earths
  - Daredevil: Visionaries
  - 300

===== Favourite Newspaper Strip =====
(Sponsored by Gosh)

- Peanuts
  - Dilbert
  - Doonesbury
  - Garfield
  - Liberty Meadows

===== Favourite Comics Related Website (professional) =====
- Comic Book Resources
  - Comicon.com
  - DC Comics.com
  - Jinxworld
  - Newsarama

===== Favourite Comics Related Website (fan-organized) =====
(Sponsored by eBay)

- Sequential Tart
  - Twist and Shout Comics Online
  - Fanzing
  - x-fan.htm
  - Class of ‘79

===== Favourite Comics E-Zine =====
- Astounding Space Thrills, by Steve Conley
  - Comic Book Net Electronic Magazine
  - The Matrix
  - Rust
  - X-Flies: Flies in Black

===== Favourite Trade Publication =====
(Sponsored by East End Offset)

- Wizard
  - Comic Book Artist
  - Comics Buyer's Guide
  - Comics International
  - The Comics Journal

===== Favourite Comics-based Film or TV Series =====
(Sponsored by SFX magazine)

- Batman Beyond
  - Big Guy and Rusty the Boy Robot
  - Mystery Men
  - Spider-Man Unlimited
  - Superman Adventures

===== Roll of Honour =====
(Sponsored by Cartoon Art Trust) A lifetime achievement award.

- Gil Kane

=== 2002 ===
Note: Voting ended in October 2001 and the winners were announced in June 2002, so news reports announced these variously as the 2001, or 2002 Eagle Awards.

==== British Section ====
===== Favourite British Comic =====
- 2000 AD
  - Judge Dredd Megazine
  - Warhammer Monthly

===== Favourite Comic Strip to Appear in a UK Comic or Magazine =====
- Nikolai Dante (2000 AD)
  - Judge Dredd (2000 AD/Judge Dredd Megazine)
  - Necronauts

===== Favourite British Small Press Title =====
- Jack Staff
  - Bazooka Jules
  - The O-Men

==== North American Section ====
The following award nominations cover creators and work published in the US and Canada only (irrespective of the country of origin of the work or the nationality of its creators), with nominations based purely on work published in 2000:

===== Favourite Colour Comicbook =====
- JSA
  - Planetary
  - Starman

===== Favourite Black & White Comicbook =====
- Liberty Meadows, by Frank Cho
  - Bone, by Jeff Smith
  - Strangers in Paradise, by Terry Moore

===== Favourite New Comicbook of 2000 =====
- Ultimate Spider-Man
  - Powers
  - Ultimate X-Men

==== International Section ====
===== Favourite Comics Writer =====
- Alan Moore
  - Brian Michael Bendis
  - Warren Ellis

===== Favourite Comics Writer/Artist =====
- Frank Miller
  - Brian Michael Bendis
  - David W. Mack

===== Favourite Comics Artist: Pencils =====
- Frank Quitely
  - Michael Avon Oeming
  - George Pérez

===== Favourite Comic Book Artist:Inks =====
- Mark Farmer
  - Paul Neary
  - Jimmy Palmiotti

===== Favourite Comics Artist:Fully Painted Artwork =====
- Alex Ross
  - Glenn Fabry
  - David Mack

===== Favourite Colourist =====
- Laura DePuy
  - Chris Blythe
  - Liquid!

===== Favourite Comics Editor =====
- Andy Diggle (Mighty Tharg: 2000 AD)
  - Tom Brevoort
  - Joe Quesada

===== Favourite Manga Comic =====
- Lone Wolf and Cub
  - Akira
  - Blade of the Immortal

===== Favourite European Comic =====
- Metabarons (France)
  - The Extended Dream of Mr. D (Spain)
  - Ratman (Italy)

===== Favourite Comics Character =====
- Batman, created by Bob Kane
  - Judge Dredd
  - Spider-Man

===== Favourite Comics Story =====
(which appeared, began or ended during 2000)

- The Authority: The Nativity
  - Starman: Grand Guignol
  - Powers: Who Killed Retro Girl?

===== Character Most Worthy of Own Ongoing Title =====
- Elijah Snow (Planetary)
  - Dr. Mid-Nite (JSA)
  - Harry Exton/Button Man (2000 AD)

===== Favourite Supporting Character in Comics =====
- Commissioner James Gordon (Batman)
  - Alfred Pennyworth (Batman)
  - Uncle Ben (Ultimate Spider-Man)

===== Favourite Comics Cover Published During 2000 =====
- Ultimate Spider-Man #1, by Joe Quesada
  - 100 Bullets #21, by Dave Johnson
  - The Authority #14, by Frank Quitely

===== Favourite Comics Villain =====
- Lex Luthor (Superman)
  - Doctor Doom (Fantastic Four)
  - The Joker (Batman)

===== Favourite Graphic Novel =====
- Safe Area Gorazde, by Joe Sacco
  - Pedro and Me, by Judd Winick
  - Torso, by Brian Michael Bendis

===== Favourite Reprint Collection =====
- The Authority: Under New Management
  - No Man's Land, Volume 1
  - Lone Wolf and Cub

===== Favourite Newspaper Strip =====
- Liberty Meadows
  - Dilbert
  - Zits

===== Favourite Magazine about Comics =====
- Wizard
  - Comics International
  - The Comics Journal

===== Favourite Comics-based Book =====
- The Amazing Adventures of Kavalier and Clay, by Michael Chabon
  - Reinventing Comics, by Scott McCloud
  - Wonder Woman: The Complete History, by Les Daniels

==== Internet Section ====
===== Favourite Comics Related Website (professional) =====
- Comic Book Resources
  - 2000ADonline
  - Newsarama

===== Favourite Comics E-Zine =====
- Comic Book Electronic Magazine
  - Fanzing
  - Sequential Tart

===== Favourite Web-based Comic =====
- Sluggy Freelance
  - Astounding Space Thrills, by Steve Conley
  - Zot!, by Scott McCloud

==== Roll of Honour ====
- Joe Quesada
  - CrossGeneration Comics
  - Warren Ellis

=== 2004 ===
Presented at the inaugural Comic Expo, held November 6–7, at the Ramada City Inn in Bristol.

==== Favourite Colour Comicbook ====
- Fantastic Four (Marvel Comics)
  - Planetary
  - The Ultimates

==== Favourite Black & White Comicbook ====
- Bone (Cartoon Books)
  - Cerebus
  - Queen & Country

==== Favourite New Comicbook ====
- Conan (Dark Horse)
  - Marvel 1602
  - The Losers

==== Favourite Comics Writer ====
- J. Michael Straczynski
  - Brian Michael Bendis
  - Mark Millar

==== Favourite Comics Writer/Artist ====
- Mike Mignola
  - Jeff Smith
  - Chris Ware

==== Favourite Comics Artist: Pencils ====
- Jim Lee
  - John Cassaday
  - Andy Kubert

==== Favourite Comics Artist: Inks ====
- Scott Williams
  - Jimmy Palmiotti
  - Kevin Nowlan

==== Favourite Comics Artist: Painted Art ====
- Alex Ross
  - Gabriel del Otto
  - Glenn Fabry

==== Favourite Colourist ====
- Laura DePuy Martin
  - Chris Blythe
  - Dave Stewart

==== Favourite Comics Editor ====
- Axel Alonzo (Marvel Comics)
  - Tom Brevoort
  - Joey Cavalieri

==== Favourite Manga Comic ====
- Blade of the Immortal (Dark Horse)
  - Battle Royale
  - Oh My Goddess

==== Favourite European Comic ====
- Tex (Sergio Bonelli Editore, Italy)
  - Blacksad (Dargaud, France)
  - El Vibora (Ediciones La Cúpula, Spain)

==== Favourite Comics Character ====
- Batman (DC)
  - Hellboy
  - Jessica Jones (Alias)

==== Favourite Comics Story ====
- Daredevil #46-50: Hardcore (Brian Michael Bendis & Alex Maleev)
  - Conan: The Legend (#0; Kurt Busiek/Cary Nord)
  - Gotham Central: Half a Life (#6-10; Greg Rucka/Michael Lark)

==== Character Most Worthy of Own Title ====
- Doctor Strange (Marvel Comics)
  - Captain Britain
  - Marvelman/Miracleman

==== Favourite Supporting Character ====
- Mary Jane Watson (Spider-Man – Marvel Comics)
  - Phoney Bone (Bone)
  - Doc Brass (Planetary)

==== Favourite Comics Cover ====
- JLA: Liberty and Justice (Alex Ross)
  - Global Frequency #7 (Brian Wood)
  - Hulk: Gray #1 (Tim Sale)

==== Favourite Comics Villain ====
- Doctor Doom (Fantastic Four – Marvel Comics)
  - Hush (Batman)
  - The Icicle (JSA)

==== Favourite Graphic Novel ====
- Sgt. Rock: Between Hell and a Hard Place (Brian Azzarello/Joe Kubert)
  - Blankets (Craig Thompson)
  - The Fixer (Joe Sacco)

==== Favourite Reprint Compilation ====
- The Chronicles of Conan (Dark Horse)
  - Absolute Authority
  - The Spirit Archives

==== Favourite Newspaper Strip ====
- Mutts (Patrick McDonnell)
  - Maakies (Tony Millionaire)
  - Spooner (Ted Dawson)

==== Favourite Magazine About Comics ====
- The Comics Journal (Fantagraphics Books)
  - Comic Book Artist
  - Comics International

==== Favourite Comics-related Book ====
- Mythology: The DC Comics Art of Alex Ross (Chip Kidd with Geoff Spear)
  - The Art of Mike Mignola
  - Sandman: King of Dreams (Alisa Kwitney)

==== Favourite Comics-based Movie or TV ====
- X2 (Bryan Singer, director)
  - American Splendor
  - Smallville

==== Favourite Comics-related Merchandise ====
- Kingdom Come action figures (DC Select; second series)
  - Doctor Doom Bust (Diamond Select)
  - HeroClix "Xplosion" set (WizKids)

==== Favourite British Comic ====
- Warhammer Monthly (Black Library)
  - Judge Dredd Megazine
  - Striker

==== Favourite Comic Strip to Appear in a UK Comic or Magazine ====
- Judge Dredd (2000 AD/Judge Dredd Megazine – Rebellion)
  - Sid the Sexist (Viz)
  - Bash Street Kids (The Beano)

==== Favourite British Small Press Title ====
- Thrud the Barbarian (Carl Critchlow)
  - Jack Staff
  - Strangehaven

==== Favourite Comics-related Website ====
- Comicon.com
  - Comic Book Resources
  - Silver Bullet Comic Books

==== Favourite Comics E-Zine ====
- Newsarama
  - The Pulse
  - Sequential Tart

==== Favourite Web-based Comic ====
- PvP (Scott Kurtz)
  - Marc Hempel's Naked Brain
  - Mike Snart

==== Roll of Honour ====
- Neil Gaiman

=== 2006 ===
The results were announced on 13 May 2006 at the Comic Expo in Bristol.

==== Favourite Colour Comicbook - American ====
- The Ultimates Volume 2 (Marvel Comics)
  - Ex Machina (DC/Wildstorm)
  - JSA (DC)

==== Favourite Colour Comicbook - British ====
- Judge Dredd Megazine (Rebellion)
  - Brodie's Law (Pulp Theatre Entertainment)
  - Midnight Kiss (Markosia)

==== Favourite Black & White Comicbook - American ====
- The Walking Dead (Image Comics)
  - Love and Rockets (Fantagraphics)
  - Queen & Country (Image)

==== Favourite Black & White Comicbook - British ====
- Springheeled Jack (Black Boar Press)
  - Freak Show (Atomic Diner)
  - Solar Wind (Solar Wind)

==== Favourite New Comicbook ====
- All-Star Superman (DC) (Grant Morrison/Frank Quitely)
  - Albion (Alan Moore/Leah Moore/John Reppion/Shane Oakley)
  - Young Avengers (Allan Heinberg/Jim Cheung/John Dell)

==== Favourite Comics Writer ====
- Grant Morrison
  - Geoff Johns
  - Brian K. Vaughan

==== Favourite Comics Writer/Artist ====
- Howard Chaykin
  - Bryan Lee O'Malley
  - Eric Powell

==== Favourite Comics Artist: Pencils ====
- Bryan Hitch
  - Alan Davis
  - Leinil Francis Yu

==== Favourite Comics Artist: Inks ====
- Jimmy Palmiotti
  - Mark Farmer
  - Ande Parks

==== Favourite Comics Artist: Fully Painted Artwork ====
- Alex Ross
  - David W. Mack
  - Kent Williams

==== Favourite Colourist ====
- Laura DePuy Martin
  - Chris Blythe
  - Dave Stewart

==== Favourite Letterer ====
- Todd Klein
  - Chris Eliopoulos
  - Richard Starkings/Comicraft

==== Favourite Comics Editor ====
- Axel Alonso
  - Shelly Bond
  - Peter Tomasi

==== Favourite Publisher ====
- DC Comics
  - IDW Publishing
  - Marvel Comics

==== Favourite Manga ====
- Blade of the Immortal (Dark Horse)
  - Cromartie High School (Elji Nonaka)
  - Shonen Jump (Various)

==== Favourite European Comic ====
- Asterix and the Falling Sky (Albert Rene Editions, France)
  - Olympus (Humanoids Publishing, France)
  - XIII (Dargaud, France)

==== Favourite Comics Character ====
- Batman
  - Hellboy
  - Judge Dredd

==== Favourite Comics Villain ====
- Joker
  - Doctor Doom
  - Doctor Light

==== Favourite Comics Story ====
- The Ultimates volume 2 #1-9 (Mark Millar, Bryan Hitch and Paul Neary)
  - The OMAC Project #1-6 (Rucka/Sai)
  - Wolverine #20-25 (Mark Millar/John Romita Jr./Klaus Janson)

==== Favourite Comics Cover ====
- All-Star Superman #1 (Frank Quitely)
  - The Amazing Adventures of the Escapist #7 (Brian Bolland)
  - The Ultimates Volume 2#2 (Bryan Hitch)

==== Favourite Original Graphic Novel ====
- Top 10: The Forty-Niners (Alan Moore and Gene Ha)
  - The Quitter (Harvey Pekar and Dean Haspiel)
  - Scott Pilgrim vs. the World (Bryan Lee O’Malley)

==== Favourite Reprint Compilation ====
- Absolute Watchmen (Alan Moore and Dave Gibbons)
  - Charley's War (Pat Mills and Joe Colquhoun)
  - Negative Burn: The Very Best of 1993–1998 (Various)

==== Favourite Magazine About Comics ====
- The Comics Journal (Fantagraphics Books)
  - Comic Book Artist (Top Shelf)
  - Comics International (Quality Communications)

==== Favourite Comics-Related Book ====
- Eisner/Miller (edited by Charles Brownstein & Diana Schutz)
  - Foul Play: The Art and Artists of the Notorious 1950s EC Comics (Grant Geissman)
  - Will Eisner: A Spirited Life (Bob Andelman)

==== Favourite Comics-based Movie or TV ====
- Batman Begins (Christopher Nolan, director)
  - A History of Violence (David Cronenberg, director)
  - Sin City (Robert Rodriguez/Frank Miller, director)

==== Favourite Comics-related Website ====
- Silver Bullet Comic Books
  - Comic Book Resources
  - Newsarama

==== Favourite Web-based Comic ====
- Supernatural Law (www.webcomicsnation.com/supernaturallaw)
  - Ctrl+Alt+Del (www.cad-comic.com)
  - Questionable Content (www.questionablecontent.net)

==== Roll of Honour ====
- Grant Morrison
  - Howard Chaykin
  - Alex Toth

==== Eagle Awards 30th Anniversary Award for Outstanding Achievements in British Comics ====
- John M. Burns

=== 2007 ===
Nominations were made by the general comics-reading public via the Eagle Awards website, with the five most popular becoming nominees for the awards. The awards ceremony was held on Saturday, May 12, 2007, at the 2007 Bristol Comic Expo and was hosted by Norman Lovett.

==== Favourite Colour Comicbook - American ====
- All-Star Superman
  - Desolation Jones
  - Fables
  - Jack Staff
  - Transformers

==== Favourite Colour Comicbook - British ====
- 2000 AD
  - Judge Dredd Megazine
  - Starship Troopers
  - Event Horizon
  - Thrud the Barbarian

==== Favourite Black & White Comicbook - American ====
- The Walking Dead
  - Casanova
  - Phonogram
  - Usagi Yojimbo
  - Wasteland

==== Favourite Black & White Comicbook - British ====
- Hero Killers
  - How to Date a Girl in Ten Days
  - Malcolm Magic
  - FutureQuake
  - Tales from the Flat

==== Favourite New Comicbook ====
- Nextwave
  - 52
  - Civil War
  - Justice Society of America
  - Testament

==== Favourite Comics Writer ====
- Warren Ellis
  - Brian K Vaughan
  - Ed Brubaker
  - Alan Moore
  - Grant Morrison

==== Favourite Comics Writer/Artist ====
- Mike Mignola
  - Alan Davis
  - Ben Templesmith
  - Darwyn Cooke
  - Michael Avon Oeming

==== Favourite Comics Artist: Pencils ====
- John Cassaday
  - Frank Quitely
  - Bryan Hitch
  - Alex Maleev
  - Frank Cho

==== Favourite Comics Artist: Inks ====
- Paul Neary
  - Ande Parks
  - Danny Miki
  - Jimmy Palmiotti
  - Mark Farmer

==== Favourite Comics Artist: Fully Painted Artwork ====
- Alex Ross
  - Alex Maleev
  - Ashley Wood
  - Ben Templesmith
  - James Jean

==== Favourite Colourist ====
- Laura Martin
  - Dave Stewart
  - Alex Sinclair
  - Chris Blythe
  - Richard Isanove

==== Favourite Letterer ====
- Chris Eliopoulos
  - Comiccraft
  - Richard Starkings
  - Todd Klein
  - Tom Frame

==== Favourite Editor ====
- Matt Smith
  - Axel Alonso
  - Tom Brevoort
  - Steve Wacker

==== Favourite Publisher ====
- Marvel Comics
  - Dark Horse Comics
  - DC Comics
  - Image Comics
  - Rebellion Developments

==== Favourite Manga ====
- Blade of the Immortal
  - Death Note
  - Naruto
  - Priest
  - Battle Royale

==== Favourite European Comic ====
- Asterix and the Vikings
  - The Killer
  - XIII
  - Sancho
  - Blacksad: Red Soul

==== Favourite Comics Character ====
- Batman
  - Captain America
  - Daredevil
  - Judge Dredd
  - Spider-Man

==== Favourite Comics Villain ====
- Dirk Anger (Nextwave: Marvel Comics|)
  - Joker (Batman family: DC)
  - Lex Luthor (Superman family: DC)
  - Black Adam (Infinite Crisis/JSA: DC)
  - Iron Man (Civil War: Marvel)

==== Favourite Comics Story Published During 2006 ====
- Nextwave #1-6
  - All-Star Superman
  - Civil War #1 up
  - Daredevil #82-87 The Devil in Cell Block D
  - 52 #1 up

==== Favourite Comics Cover Published During 2006 ====
- Fables: 1001 Nights of Snowfall (James Jean)
  - Civil War #1 (Steve McNiven)
  - The Ultimates 2 #12 (Bryan Hitch)
  - Nextwave #11 (Stuart Immonen)
  - 52 #1 (J.G. Jones)
  - Justice League of America #1 (Ed Benes)

==== Favourite Original Graphic Novel ====
- Pride of Baghdad
  - Stagger Lee
  - Fables: 1001 Nights of Snowfall
  - The Five Fists of Science
  - Lost Girls

==== Favourite Reprint Compilation ====
- Absolute Sandman v1
  - Captain America: Winter Soldier v1
  - Absolute Dark Knight
  - Absolute DC: The New Frontier
  - Absolute Kingdom Come

==== Favourite Magazine About Comics ====
- Wizard
  - Alter Ego
  - Back Issue!
  - Comics International
  - The Comics Journal

==== Favourite Comics-related Book ====
- Making Comics: Storytelling Secrets of Comics, Manga and Graphic Novels (Scott McCloud; HarperCollins)
  - George Pérez: Story Teller (Dynamite)
  - Great British Comics (Paul Gravett and Peter Stanbury; Aurum Press)
  - The Art of Brian Bolland (Image/Desperado)
  - Writing For Comics With Peter David (Impact Books)

==== Favourite Comics-based Movie or TV ====
- Heroes
  - Justice League Unlimited
  - Superman Returns
  - Hellboy Animated
  - V for Vendetta

==== Favourite Comics-related Website ====
- Newsarama
  - Comic Book Resources
  - Manga Life
  - Millarworld
  - Silver Bullet Comic Books

==== Favourite Web-based Comic ====
- Penny Arcade
  - Drastic Comics
  - Sonic the Comic Online
  - PvP
  - Dreamland Chronicles

==== Roll of Honour ====
- Warren Ellis
  - Alex Toth
  - Brian K. Vaughan
  - Brian Michael Bendis
  - Tom Frame

=== 2008 ===
The ceremony was held on Saturday May 10, 2008, at the Bristol Comic Expo, and the awards were presented by comedian Fraser Ayres.

==== Award for Favourite Newcomer Writer ====
- Matt Fraction
  - Jason Aaron
  - Nick Tapalansky
  - Simon Spurrier
  - Tony Lee

==== Award for Favourite Newcomer Artist ====
- David Aja
  - Azim Akberali
  - Cliff Chiang
  - Declan Shalvey
  - Mahmud A. Asrar

==== Award for Favourite Comics Writer ====
- Alan Moore
  - Brian K. Vaughan
  - Brian Michael Bendis
  - Ed Brubaker
  - Warren Ellis

==== Award for Favourite Comics Writer/Artist ====
- Alan Davis
  - Bob Byrne
  - Bryan Talbot
  - Darwyn Cooke
  - Eric Powell

==== Award for Favourite Comics Artist: Pencils ====
- Frank Cho
  - Bryan Hitch
  - Ethan Van Sciver
  - Frank Quitely
  - Thomas Boatwright

==== Award for Favourite Comics Artist: Inks ====
- D'Israeli (Matt Brooker)
  - Ande Parks
  - Frank Quitely
  - Gary Erskine
  - Thomas Boatwright

==== Award for Favourite Artist: Fully-Painted Artwork ====
- Alex Ross
  - Ashley Wood
  - Azim Akberali
  - Ben Templesmith
  - Marko Djurdjevic

==== Award for Favourite Colourist ====
- Laura Martin
  - D'Israeli (Matt Brooker)
  - Dave Stewart
  - Matt Hollingsworth
  - Richard Isanove

==== Award for Favourite Letterer ====
- Dave Gibbons
  - Chris Eliopoulos
  - Richard Starkings
  - Thomas Mauer
  - Todd Klein

==== Award for Favourite Editor ====
- Tharg (Matt Smith)
  - Axel Alonso
  - Chris Ryall
  - Kris Simon
  - Tom Brevoort

==== Award for Favourite Publisher ====
- Marvel Comics
  - Dark Horse Comics
  - DC Comics
  - Image
  - Vertigo

==== Award for Favourite Colour Comicbook - American ====
- Hellboy: Darkness Calls
  - All-Star Superman
  - Awakening
  - Captain America
  - Y: The Last Man

==== Award for Favourite Colour Comicbook - British ====
- Spectacular Spider-Man
  - 2000 AD
  - Hope Falls
  - Judge Dredd Megazine
  - Starship Troopers

==== Award for Favourite Black and White Comicbook - American ====
- The Walking Dead
  - Local
  - Phonogram
  - Usagi Yojimbo
  - Wasteland

==== Award for Favourite Black and White Comicbook - British ====
- How to Date a Girl in Ten Days
  - Biomecha
  - Eleventh Hour
  - FutureQuake
  - Tales from the Flat
  - Walking Wounded

==== Award for Favourite New Comicbook ====
- Thor
  - Awakening
  - Dan Dare
  - Hope Falls
  - Immortal Iron Fist
  - The Umbrella Academy

==== Award for Favourite Manga ====
- Death Note
  - Blade of the Immortal
  - Bleach
  - Dragon Ball Z
  - Naruto

==== Award for Favourite European Comics ====
- Requiem, Vampire Knight
  - Blacksad
  - Dylan Dog
  - Sancho
  - The Killer

==== Award for Favourite Comics Story published during 2007 ====
- Captain America 25-30: The Death of Captain America
  - Criminal 6-10: Lawless
  - Green Lantern: Sinestro Corps War
  - Hellboy: Darkness Calls
  - Y: The Last Man 55–60

==== Award for Favourite Comics Cover published during 2007 ====
- World War Hulk 1A (David Finch)
  - Fables 66 (James Jean)
  - Immortal Iron Fist 4 (David Aja)
  - Northlanders 1B (Adam Kubert)
  - The Umbrella Academy 1 (James Jean)

==== Award for Favourite Original Graphic Novel ====
- The League of Extraordinary Gentlemen: Black Dossier
  - Alice in Sunderland
  - The Goon: Chinatown
  - The Order of the Stick: Start of Darkness
  - The Surreal Adventures of Edgar Allan Poo

==== Award for Favourite Reprint Compilation ====
- Absolute Sandman Volume 2
  - Criminal 1: Coward
  - Dynamo 5 Vol 1
  - Immortal Iron Fist: The Last Iron Fist Story
  - Strontium Dog Search/Destroy Agency Files 03

==== Award for Favourite Comics Hero ====
- Batman
  - Dan Dare
  - Hellboy
  - Judge Dredd
  - Spider-Man

==== Award for Favourite Comics Villain ====
- Joker
  - Doctor Doom
  - Harley Quinn
  - Iron Man
  - Sinestro

==== Award for Favourite Magazine About Comics ====
- Wizard
  - Back Issue!
  - Comics International
  - Draw!
  - The Comics Journal
  - Write Now!

==== Award for Favourite Comics-Related Book ====
- Our Gods Wear Spandex
  - Pulphope: The Art of Paul Pope
  - Reading Comics: How Graphic Novels Work and What They Mean
  - Thrill Power Overload
  - Uno Tarino: The Latest Art of Ashley Wood

==== Award for Favourite Comics-Based Movie Or TV ====
- 300
  - 30 Days of Night
  - Heroes
  - Spider-Man 3
  - Stardust

==== Award for Favourite Comics Related Website ====
- Marvel.com
  - 2000ADonline
  - Comic Book Resources
  - Jinxworld
  - Newsarama

==== Award for Favourite Web-Based Comic ====
- The Order of the Stick
  - Girl Genius
  - Penny Arcade
  - PvP
  - The Adventures of Dr. McNinja

==== Award for Roll of Honour ====
- Mike Mignola
  - Bill Sienkiewicz
  - Brian Bolland
  - Brian K. Vaughan
  - Mike Wieringo

=== 2010 ===
The 2009 vote was skipped but the 2010 awards (for work done in 2009) were presented at the London MCM Expo in a gala held at ExCeL London on 29 October 2009.

==== Favourite Newcomer Writer ====
- Jonathan Hickman
  - Al Ewing
  - Kathryn Immonen
  - Kieron Gillen
  - Mike Lynch

==== Favourite Newcomer Artist ====
- Jamie McKelvie
  - David Lafuente
  - Declan Shalvey
  - John Cullen
  - Matt Timson

==== Favourite Writer ====
- Warren Ellis
  - Alan Moore
  - Geoff Johns
  - John Wagner
  - Tony Lee

==== Favourite Writer/Artist ====
- Darwyn Cooke
  - Bryan Lee O'Malley
  - David Mazzucchelli
  - John Byrne
  - Paul Grist

==== Favourite Artist: Pencils ====
- Frank Quitely
  - Guy Davis
  - Ivan Reis
  - J. H. Williams III
  - Stuart Immonen

==== Favourite Artist: Inks ====
- Kevin O'Neill
  - Butch Guice
  - Charlie Adlard
  - Gary Erskine
  - Mark Farmer

==== Favourite Artist: Fully-Painted Artwork ====
- J. H. Williams III
  - Adi Granov
  - Alex Ross
  - Ben Templesmith
  - James Jean

==== Favourite Colourist ====
- Ben Templesmith
  - Christina Strain
  - Dave Stewart
  - Laura Martin
  - Len O'Grady

==== Favourite Letterer ====
- Todd Klein
  - Annie Parkhouse
  - Chris Eliopoulos
  - Nate Piekos
  - Richard Starkings
  - Simon Bowland

==== Favourite Editor ====
- Axel Alonso
  - Matt Smith
  - Nick Lowe
  - Stephen Wacker
  - Tom Brevoort

==== Favourite Publisher ====
- DC Comics/Vertigo
  - IDW Publishing
  - Image Comics
  - Marvel Comics
  - Rebellion Developments (2000 AD)

==== Favourite American Colour Comicbook ====
- Batman and Robin
  - B.P.R.D.
  - Captain Britain and MI13
  - Chew
  - Doctor Who (IDW)
  - Phonogram: The Singles Club
  - Scalped

==== Favourite British Colour Comicbook ====
- 2000 AD
  - Spandex
  - The Beano
  - The Dead: Kingdom of Flies
  - The DFC

==== Favourite American Black and White Comicbook ====
- The Walking Dead
  - I Kill Giants
  - Scott Pilgrim
  - The Venger: Dead Man Rising
  - Usagi Yojimbo

==== Favourite British Black and White Comicbook ====
- Whatever Happened to The World's Fastest Man?
  - Chloe Noonan
  - Dragon Heir
  - FutureQuake
  - Space Babe 113

==== Favourite New Comicbook ====
- Batman and Robin
  - Chew
  - Doctor Who
  - Rí Rá
  - The Unwritten

==== Favourite Manga ====
- Fullmetal Alchemist
  - GoGo Monster
  - Kurosagi Corpse Delivery Service
  - Pluto
  - Reya

==== Favourite European Comicbook ====
- Requiem Chevalier Vampire
  - Chimpanzee Complex
  - Largo Winch
  - L'Histoire Secrete
  - Rí Rá

==== Favourite Single Story Published During 2009 ====
- Phonogram: The Singles Club #4: "Konichiwa Bitches"
  - Doctor Who: "The Time Machination"
  - Doctor Who: "Black Death White Life"
  - From the Pages of Bram Stoker's Dracula: Harker
  - R.E.B.E.L.S. Annual #1: "Starro the Conqueror"

==== Favourite Continued Story Published During 2009 ====
- The Walking Dead #61-65: "Fear The Hunters"
  - Doctor Who: The Forgotten
  - Judge Dredd: "Tour of Duty"
  - Phonogram: The Singles Club
  - Scalped #19-24: "The Gravel in your Gut"

==== Favourite Cover Published During 2009 ====
- Batman and Robin #4 (Frank Quitely)
  - 2000 AD #1631 (D'Israeli featuring Dirty Frank)
  - Batgirl #2 (Phil Noto)
  - Batman and Robin #3 (Frank Quitely)
  - Doctor Who: The Forgotten #6 (Ben Templesmith)

==== Favourite Original Graphic Novel Published During 2009 ====
- The League of Extraordinary Gentlemen, Volume III: Century
  - Asterios Polyp
  - Grandville
  - Mouse Guard: Winter 1152
  - The Hunter

==== Favourite Reprint Compilation ====
- Captain Britain by Alan Moore and Alan Davis Omnibus
  - Charley's War: Underground and Over The Top
  - Doctor Who: The Forgotten
  - Saga of the Swamp Thing
  - The Rocketeer: The Complete Adventures

==== Favourite Magazine about Comics ====
- Wizard
  - Back Issue!
  - Comics International
  - The Comics Journal
  - Tripwire

==== Favourite Comics-Related Book ====
- The Insider's Guide to Creating Comics and Graphic Novels by Andy Schmidt
  - Comic Book Design by Gary Millidge
  - Peter and Max: A Fables Novel by Bill Willingham
  - The Marvel Art of Marko Djurdjevic
  - War Stories by Mike Conroy

==== Favourite Comics-Related Movie or TV Show ====
- Watchmen
  - Heroes
  - Smallville
  - Surrogates
  - The Big Bang Theory

==== Favourite Comics Related Website ====
- Comic Book Resources
  - 2000adonline
  - Bleeding Cool
  - Forbidden Planet Blog
  - Newsarama

==== Favourite Web-Based Comic ====
- FreakAngels
  - The Order of the Stick
  - PvP
  - Sin Titulo
  - xkcd

==== Roll of Honour ====
- Brian Bolland
  - Dick Giordano
  - Joe Kubert
  - John Hicklenton
  - Peter David

=== 2011 ===
The awards for work in 2010 on 27 May 2011 and was presented by Billy West.

==== Favourite Newcomer Writer ====
- Paul Cornell
  - Bryan Lee O'Malley
  - Nick Spencer
  - Al Ewing
  - Scott Snyder

==== Favourite Newcomer Artist ====
- Sara Pichelli
  - Rafael Albuquerque
  - Fiona Staples
  - Sean Murphy
  - Bryan Lee O'Malley

==== Favourite Writer ====
- Grant Morrison
  - Ed Brubaker
  - Robert Kirkman
  - Warren Ellis
  - John Wagner

==== Favourite Writer/Artist ====
- Mike Mignola
  - Gabriel Ba (with co-author Fabio Moon)
  - Darwyn Cooke
  - Jeff Lemire

==== Favourite Artist: Pencils ====
- J. H. Williams III
  - Mike Mignola
  - Dave Ryan
  - Carlos Ezquerra
  - Becky Cloonan

==== Favourite Artist: Inks ====
- Mike Mignola
  - Carlos Ezquerra
  - Gary Erskine
  - Becky Cloonan
  - Bill Sienkiewicz

==== Favourite Artist: Fully-Painted Artwork ====
- J. H. Williams III
  - Ben Templesmith
  - D'Israeli
  - Alex Ross
  - Jock

==== Favourite Colourist ====
- Dave Stewart
  - Jeff Balke
  - Len O'Grady
  - Laura Martin
  - Laura Allred

==== Favourite Letterer ====
- Richard Starkings
  - Annie Parkhouse
  - Rus Wooton
  - Jim Campbell
  - Chris Eliopoulos

==== Favourite Editor ====
- Matt Smith/Tharg
  - Scott Allie
  - Tom Brevoort
  - Steve Wacker
  - Todd McFarlane

==== Favourite Publisher ====
- DC Comics/Vertigo/WildStorm
  - Dark Horse Comics
  - Image Comics/Top Cow
  - IDW Publishing
  - Marvel Comics

==== Favourite American Comicbook: Colour ====
- Batman and Robin
  - Doctor Who
  - Amazing Spider-Man
  - Buffy the Vampire Slayer Season Eight
  - Hellboy

==== Favourite American Comicbook: Black and White ====
- The Walking Dead
  - Echo
  - Age of Bronze
  - Demo Volume 2
  - RASL

==== Favourite British Comicbook: Colour ====
- 2000 AD
  - Doctor Who Magazine
  - The Man of Glass
  - Torchwood
  - Dandy

==== Favourite British Comicbook: Black and White ====
- Commando
  - Zarjaz
  - Dogbreath
  - FutureQuake
  - Paragon

==== Favourite New Comicbook ====
- Daytripper
  - S.H.I.E.L.D
  - Alan Moore's Neonomicon
  - War of the Independents
  - American Vampire

==== Favourite Manga ====
- Fullmetal Alchemist
  - One Piece
  - Berserk
  - Bleach
  - Naruto

==== Favourite European Comicbook ====
- Blacksad
  - The Scorpion
  - L'Histoire Secrete
  - Sky Doll
  - Requiem Vampire Knight

==== Favourite Web-Based Comic ====
- Axe Cop
  - FreakAngels
  - xkcd
  - Hark! A Vagrant!
  - Questionable Content

==== Favourite Single Story ====
- Daytripper #8
  - Legends: The Enchanted #0
  - A Cat Named Haiku
  - Sea Bear and Grizzly Shark
  - Amazing Spider-Man #625: "Endanger Species"

==== Favourite Continued Story ====
- The Walking Dead #73-79: "Too Far Gone"
  - Hellboy #47-49: "The Storm"
  - Fables #94-98: "Rose Red"
  - Invincible #71-ongoing: "The Viltrumite War"
  - 2000 AD #1650-1693: Judge Dredd: "Tour of Duty"

==== Favourite 2010 Cover ====
- Batwoman #0 by J.H. Williams III
  - Daytripper #2 by Gabriel Ba
  - 2000 AD #1700 by Jonathan Davis Hunt
  - War of the Independents by Dave Ryan
  - Axe Cop, Volume 1 by Ethan Nicolle

==== Favourite 2010 Original Graphic Novel ====
- Scott Pilgrim, Volume 6: Scott Pilgrim's Finest Hour
  - Richard Stark's Parker: The Outfit
  - Superman: Earth One
  - Hellblazer: Pandemonium
  - At The Mountains of Madness

==== Favourite Reprint Compilation ====
- Absolute All Star Superman
  - Charley's War: Great Mutiny
  - Batwoman: Elegy
  - The Walking Dead, Volume 13
  - Doctor Who: Fugitive

==== Favourite Comics-Related Book ====
- 75 Years of DC Comics (by Paul Levitz, Taschen)
  - Icons: The DC Comics and Wildstorm Art of Jim Lee (Titan Books)
  - The Horror, The Horror: Comic Books The Government Didn't Want You To Read (Harry N. Abrams, Inc.)
  - Mega-City One Archives (Mongoose Publishing)
  - Cover Run: The DC Comic Art of Adam Hughes (DC Comics)

==== Favourite Comics-Related Movie or TV Show ====
- Scott Pilgrim vs. the World
  - Kick Ass
  - The Big Bang Theory
  - The Walking Dead
  - Iron Man 2

==== Favourite Comics-Related Website ====
- Comic Book Resources
  - Newsarama
  - ComicsAlliance
  - Comic Attack
  - Bleeding Cool
  - Girls Read Comics Too

==== Favourite Magazine about Comics ====
- Wizard
  - Back Issue!
  - Alter Ego
  - Tripwire
  - Comic Heroes

==== Roll of Honour ====
- Dave Gibbons
  - Bryan Lee O'Malley
  - John Byrne
  - Carlos Ezquerra
  - David Mazzucchelli

=== 2012 ===
The 2012 Eagle Awards were announced on 25 May 2012.

==== Favourite Newcomer Writer ====
- Jeff Lemire
  - J. H. Williams III
  - Michael Carroll
  - Nathan Edmondson
  - Robert Curley

==== Favourite Newcomer Artist ====
- Francesco Francavilla
  - Axel Medellin
  - Declan Shalvey
  - Emanuela Lupacchino
  - Mahmud Asrar

==== Favourite Writer ====
- Scott Snyder
  - Alan Moore
  - Ed Brubaker
  - Geoff Johns
  - Grant Morrison

==== Favourite Writer/Artist ====
- Frank Miller
  - Darwyn Cooke
  - Francis Manapul
  - J. H. Williams III
  - Jeff Lemire

==== Favourite Artist: Pencils ====
- J. H. Williams III
  - Becky Cloonan
  - Chris Bachalo
  - Ivan Reis
  - Jim Lee

==== Favourite Artist: Inks ====
- Scott Williams
  - Becky Cloonan
  - Chris Samnee
  - D'Israeli
  - Gary Erskine

==== Favourite Artist: Fully Painted Artwork ====
- Alex Ross
  - Adi Granov
  - Esad Ribić
  - J. H. Williams III
  - Sean Phillips

==== Favourite Colourist ====
- Dave Stewart
  - Jamie Grant
  - Jeff Balke
  - Laura Martin
  - Rod Reis

==== Favourite Letterer ====
- Richard Starkings/Comicraft
  - Annie Parkhouse
  - Chris Eliopoulos
  - Ed Dukeshire
  - Todd Klein

==== Favourite Editor ====
- Karen Berger
  - Chris Ryall
  - Matt Smith
  - Steve Wacker
  - Tom Brevoort

==== Favourite Publisher ====
- DC Comics/Vertigo
  - Dark Horse Comics
  - IDW Publishing
  - Image Comics
  - Marvel Comics

==== Favourite American Comicbook: Colour ====
- Batman
  - Aquaman
  - Batwoman
  - Daredevil
  - Hellboy

==== Favourite American Comicbook: Black and White ====
- The Walking Dead
  - Echoes
  - RASL
  - Usagi Yojimbo
  - Wolves

==== Favourite British Comicbook: Colour ====
- Doctor Who Magazine
  - 2000 AD
  - CLiNT
  - Judge Dredd Megazine
  - STRIP Magazine

==== Favourite British Comicbook: Black and White ====
- Viz
  - Blood Blokes
  - Commando
  - Futurequake
  - Lou Scannon
  - Zarjaz

==== Favourite New Comicbook ====
- Batman
  - Animal Man
  - Aquaman
  - Daredevil
  - Wolverine and the X-Men

==== Favourite Manga ====
- 20th Century Boys
  - Blade of the Immortal
  - Bleach
  - Naruto
  - One Piece

==== Favourite European Comicbook ====
- Dylan Dog
  - Betelgeuse
  - Jennifer Wilde
  - League of Volunteers
  - Requiem Vampire Knight

==== Favourite Web-Based Comic ====
- Freakangels
  - Ace Kilroy
  - Axe Cop
  - Hark! A Vagrant
  - xkcd.com

==== Favourite Single Story ====
- Doctor Who (IDW) #12
  - The Amazing Spider-Man #655
  - Animal Man #1
  - Aquaman #4
  - Daredevil #7

==== Favourite Continued Story ====
- Walking Dead: "No Way Out"
  - American Vampire: "Ghost War"
  - Batwoman: "Hydrology"
  - Chew: "Flambe"
  - Detective Comics: "The Black Mirror"

==== Favourite 2011 Cover ====
- Batwoman #1 by J.H. Williams III
  - 2000 AD #1752 by D'Israeli (featuring Dirty Frank)
  - Aquaman #1 by Ivan Reis
  - Daredevil #1 by Paolo Rivera
  - Detective Comics #880 by Jock

==== Favourite 2011 Original Graphic Novel ====
- Batman: Noël
  - Habibi
  - Hellboy: House of the Living Dead
  - League of Extraordinary Gentlemen: Century: 1969
  - New Teen Titans: Games

==== Favourite Reprint Compilation ====
- Thor Omnibus by Walt Simonson
  - Aquaman: Death of A Prince
  - Detective Comics: The Black Mirror
  - Walking Dead, Volume 15
  - We3 Deluxe Edition

==== Favourite Comics-Related Book ====
- Supergods: Our World in the Age of the Superhero
  - 1001 Comics You Must Read Before You Die
  - Alan Moore: Storyteller
  - The Batman Files
  - The Marvel Art of John Romita, Jr.

==== Favourite Comics-Related Movie or TV Show ====
- The Big Bang Theory
  - Captain America: The First Avenger
  - Misfits
  - Walking Dead
  - X-Men: First Class

==== Favourite Comics-Related Website ====
- Bleeding Cool
  - Comic Book Resources
  - ComicsAlliance
  - Newsarama
  - Zona Negativa

==== Favourite Magazine about Comics ====
- DC Comics Superhero Collection
  - Alter Ego
  - Back Issue!
  - Comic Heroes
  - Comics Journal

==== Roll of Honour ====
- Frank Quitely
  - Adam Hughes
  - Brian Michael Bendis
  - Darwyn Cooke
  - Geoff Johns

=== 2014 ===
The Eagle Awards returned one last time, renamed as The True Believers Comics Award but keeping essentially the same format as in the past. They were presented at the London Film and Comic Con (with Anthony Stewart Head hosting) on July 12, 2014.

==== Favourite Rising Star: Writer ====
- Matt Fraction
  - Al Ewing
  - Charles Soule
  - Katie Cook
  - Scott Snyder

==== Favourite Rising Star: Artist ====
- Fiona Staples
  - Annie Wu
  - Declan Shalvey
  - Katie Cook
  - Sean Murphy

==== Favourite Writer ====
- Matt Fraction
  - Alan Moore
  - James Roberts
  - Kelly Sue DeConnick
  - Scott Snyder

==== Favourite Artist: Pencils ====
- Fiona Staples
  - Becky Cloonan
  - David Aja
  - Greg Capullo
  - J.H. Williams

==== Favourite Artist: Inks ====
- Becky Cloonan
  - Bill Sienkiewicz
  - Brian Bolland
  - David Aja
  - J.H. Williams III

==== Favourite Artist: Fully-Painted Art ====
- Fiona Staples
  - Adi Granov
  - Alex Ross
  - Francesco Francavilla
  - J.H. Williams III

==== Favourite Colourist ====
- Matt Hollingsworth
  - Francesco Francavilla
  - Jordie Bellaire
  - Laura Allred
  - Laura Martin

==== Favourite Letterer ====
- Annie Parkhouse
  - Comicraft
  - Jim Campbell
  - Terry Moore
  - Todd Klein

==== Favourite Editor ====
- Chris Ryall
  - Matt Smith
  - Nick Lowe
  - Scott Allie
  - Stephen Wacker

==== Favourite American Comicbook: Colour ====
- Saga
  - Batman
  - Hawkeye
  - Sex Criminals
  - Transformers: More than Meets the Eye

==== Favourite British Comic: Colour ====
- 2000 AD
  - Death Sentence
  - Dungeon Fun
  - Porcelain: A Gothic Fairy Tale
  - Saltire Invasion

==== Favourite American Comicbook: Black and White ====
- The Walking Dead
  - Batman Black and White
  - Punk Rock Jesus
  - Rachel Rising
  - Satellite Sam

==== Favourite British Comic: Black and White ====
- Good Cop Bad Cop by Jim Alexander
  - Dexter's Half Dozen
  - Futurequake
  - School of Bitches
  - Wolf Country

==== Favourite New Comics Title: Ongoing or Mini-Series ====
- Guardians of the Galaxy
  - East of West
  - Pretty Deadly
  - Rat Queens
  - Sex Criminals
  - The Wake

==== Favourite European Comicbook ====
- Asterix and the Picts
  - Amoras
  - Celtic Warrior: The Legend of Cú Chulainn
  - Finn & Fish
  - Orfani

==== Favourite Manga ====
- Attack on Titan
  - Bleach
  - Naruto
  - One Piece
  - Yotsuba&!

==== Favourite Original Graphic Novel ====
- Avengers: Endless Wartime
  - Battling Boy
  - Nemo: Heart of Ice
  - Richard Stark's Parker: Slayground
  - The Fifth Beatle: The Brian Epstein Story
  - The Unwritten: Tommy Taylor and the Ship That Sank Twice

==== Favourite Reprint Compilation ====
- Hawkeye Volume 1 Oversized H/C
  - Captain America: The Winter Soldier
  - Jeff Smith's Bone's The Great Cow Race: Artist's Edition
  - The Joker: The Clown Prince of Crime
  - Zenith

==== Favourite Single Story ====
- "Pizza is my Business," Hawkeye #11
  - "Cybertronian Homesick Blues", Transformers: More Than Meets the Eye #13
  - "Kingdoms Fall" Infinity #3
  - "The End" Locke & Key: Alpha #2
  - Afterlife with Archie #1

==== Favourite Continued Story ====
- Saga
  - Batman #21 on – "Zero Year"
  - Fables #125-129 – "Snow White"
  - The Walking Dead #115 on – "All Out War"
  - Transformers: More Than Meets the Eye #17-21 – "Remain in Light"

==== Favourite 2013 Cover ====
- Hawkeye #9 (David Aja)
  - Fables #134
  - Pretty Deadly #1
  - Rat Queens #1
  - Sex Criminals #1

==== Favourite Publisher ====
- IDW Publishing
  - DC Comics
  - Image
  - Marvel
  - Rebellion

==== Favourite Web-Based Comic ====
- Aces Weekly – www.acesweekly.co.uk
  - Dumbing of Age – www.dumbingofage.com
  - JL8: A Webcomic – www.jl8comic.tumblr.com
  - Oglaf – www.oglaf.com
  - XKCD – www.xkcd.com

==== Favourite Magazine (Print Periodical) about Comics ====
- Bleeding Cool
  - Back Issue
  - Comic Heroes
  - Judge Dredd Megazine
  - The Comics Journal

==== Favourite Comics-Related Book ====
- The Secret History of Marvel Comics: Jack Kirby and the Moonlighting Artists at Martin Goodman's Empire by Blake Bell and Michael J. Vassallo
  - Genius, Illustrated: The Life and Time of Alex Toth
  - Magic Words: The Extraordinary Life of Alan Moore
  - The DC Comics Guide to Creating Comics: Inside the Art of Visual Storytelling
  - The Fables Encyclopaedia

==== Favourite Comic Related Movie or TV Show ====
- Iron Man 3
  - Agents of S.H.I.E.L.D.
  - Arrow
  - The Walking Dead
  - Thor: The Dark World

==== Favourite Comics-Related Website ====
- Comic Book Resources – www.comicbookresources.com
  - 2000 AD Online – www.2000adonline.com
  - Bleeding Cool – www.bleedingcool.com
  - ComicsAlliance – www.comicsalliance.com
  - The Mary Sue – www.themarysue.com

==== Roll of Honour ====
- Gail Simone
  - Jean Giraud (Moebius)
  - Jim Lee
  - Karen Berger
  - Walter Simonson
