= Casus Belli (magazine) =

Tabletop role-playing and wargame magazine

- Issue 83 (October–November 1994) cover by Jean-Louis Mourier
- Frequency: Monthly, bimonthly, quarterly
- Publisher: Excelsior Publications; Arkana Press; Casus Belli Presse; Black Book Éditions
- Founded: 1980
- Country: France
- Based in: Paris
- Language: French
- Website: Casus Belli

Casus Belli is a French magazine about role-playing games, published in different formats since 1980. It contains news, reviews, interviews, features, and role-playing game materials. The magazine was published by Excelsior Publications until 1999, by Arkana Press in 2000–2006, and by Casus Belli Presse in 2010–2011, and has been published by Black Book Éditions since 2011. Since 2020, it also has the online video companion Casus TV, which is produced in collaboration with Tric Trac.

== History ==
Publishers of Casus Belli over time
#	Years	Publisher	Ref.
1	1980–1999	Excelsior Publications	
2	2000–2006	Arkana Press	
3	2010–2011	Casus Belli Presse	
4	2011–2026	Black Book Éditions	

Casus Belli has been released in different forms since 1980, originally under editor-in-chief François Marcela-Froideval and published by Excelsior Publications; for its first few issues, it was a short, black-and-white publication, before changing to a larger format printed in color. In this incarnation, it became the leading role-playing game magazine on the French market. The artists working on this edition included the cartoonist Tignous.

The magazine ended publication in 1999, but was taken up again by Arkana Press in 2000, who continued publishing it until 2006. Casus Belli Presse, a new publisher, was formed in 2009, and continued publishing the magazine monthly starting in July 2010, but stopped in 2011 after five issues.

Black Book Éditions took over in the same year, in a bimonthly – at times quarterly – mook format. Issues are released digitally first, and then in print editions sold in specialty stores and book stores. Since 2020, Black Book Éditions also publishes Casus TV, an online, video-based companion to the magazine, in collaboration with the game news site Tric Trac. In 2024, it was announced that publication of this era would end following the release of the 50th issue.

== Content ==
Casus Belli contains French and international role-playing game news, reviews, interviews, features about role-playing, comics, adventure modules for use with a variety of role-playing games, and complete role-playing games, such as Petit Peuple RPG (1992) and D3 (2015).

Laelith, a medieval fantasy setting intended to be usable with many different tabletop role-playing games, was developed through features in Casus Belli since December 1986, and was compiled in 1991 and published as a Casus Belli special; a second edition followed in December 2000; and a third in 2016, which was intended for use with Héros & Dragons, Black Book Éditions' French adaptation of Dungeons & Dragons' fifth edition by Casus Belli staff.

== Reception ==
Slate described Casus Belli as a venerable French role-playing magazine. In his book Jeux de rôles, jeux vidéo, multimédia, Laurent Tremel described the magazine's beginnings as coming across as amateurish, reminiscent of fanzines, before its change to its larger format, which he considered more professional. Di6dent, another French game publication, called the magazine beautiful, and appreciated the variety in the adventure modules it publishes, although noted that its release schedule meant that the news section sometimes featured old news. Polish magazine Magia i Miecz found Casus Belli's graphic design outstanding, with great use of color and illustration, and appreciated the international scope of its news coverage.
