= François Marcela-Froideval =

French role-playing game creator (1958–2025)

- Born: 10 December 1958
- Died: 17 June 2025 (aged 66) Paris, France
- Areas: Writer/scenarist for comics, role-playing games, and video games
- Notable works: Chroniques de la Lune Noire, Fatum, 666

François Marcela-Froideval (10 December 1958 – 17 June 2025) was a French role-playing game creator, video game producer, and comic scenarist.

== Life and career ==
Froideval had a major influence on the introduction of role-playing games in France, mainly as editor-in-chief of the Casus Belli role-playing magazine. During this time, he was one of the three authors who established the French term for a "munchkin", Gros Bill, from the nickname of an overly powergaming player once in Froideval's group.

He left for the United States in 1982 to join TSR, Inc., where he worked for four years. His writing contributions include several Advanced Dungeons & Dragons rules and monster manuals in collaboration with Gary Gygax, like Oriental Adventures. Gygax credited Froideval with the idea to add a seventh ability score to the game tracking the appearance of characters, called comeliness. Back in France, he focused on translating and publishing TSR games until 1989.

Marcela-Froideval wrote the scenario of several French videogames, working for Infogrames (Drakkhen) and Cryo Interactive (Dragon Lore series).

In 1989, he wrote the scenario of the first Black Moon Chronicles comic album with drawer Olivier Ledroit. He kept on writing the scenario until the end of the series in 2008.

Froideval dedicated the Black Moon Chronicles series to Gary Gygax in the last album End of Times through these words:

Cette série est dédiée à E. Gary Gygax, le premier grand rêveur, l'inventeur du jeu de rôle, celui sans qui l'heroïc-fantasy et la science-fiction ne seraient à l'heure actuelle qu'un genre mineur presque oublié. À ce géant discret qui a fait rêver des millions de joueurs.
À mon maître, à mon ami. Puisse-t-il éternellement vivre dans les univers qu'il a patiemment tissés.
In loving memory.

Translation:

This series is dedicated to E. Gary Gygax, the first great dreamer, inventor of the role-playing game, without whom the heroic fantasy and science-fiction genre would only be today a minor, almost forgotten genre. To this quiet giant who made millions of players dream.
To my master and friend. May he live forever in the universe he so patiently wove.
In loving memory.

He wrote scenarios for Black Moon spin-off series and other French comic series.

Marcela-Froideval died aged 66, on 17 June 2025, in Paris, France.
