= Chris Ryall =

American comic book writer and editor

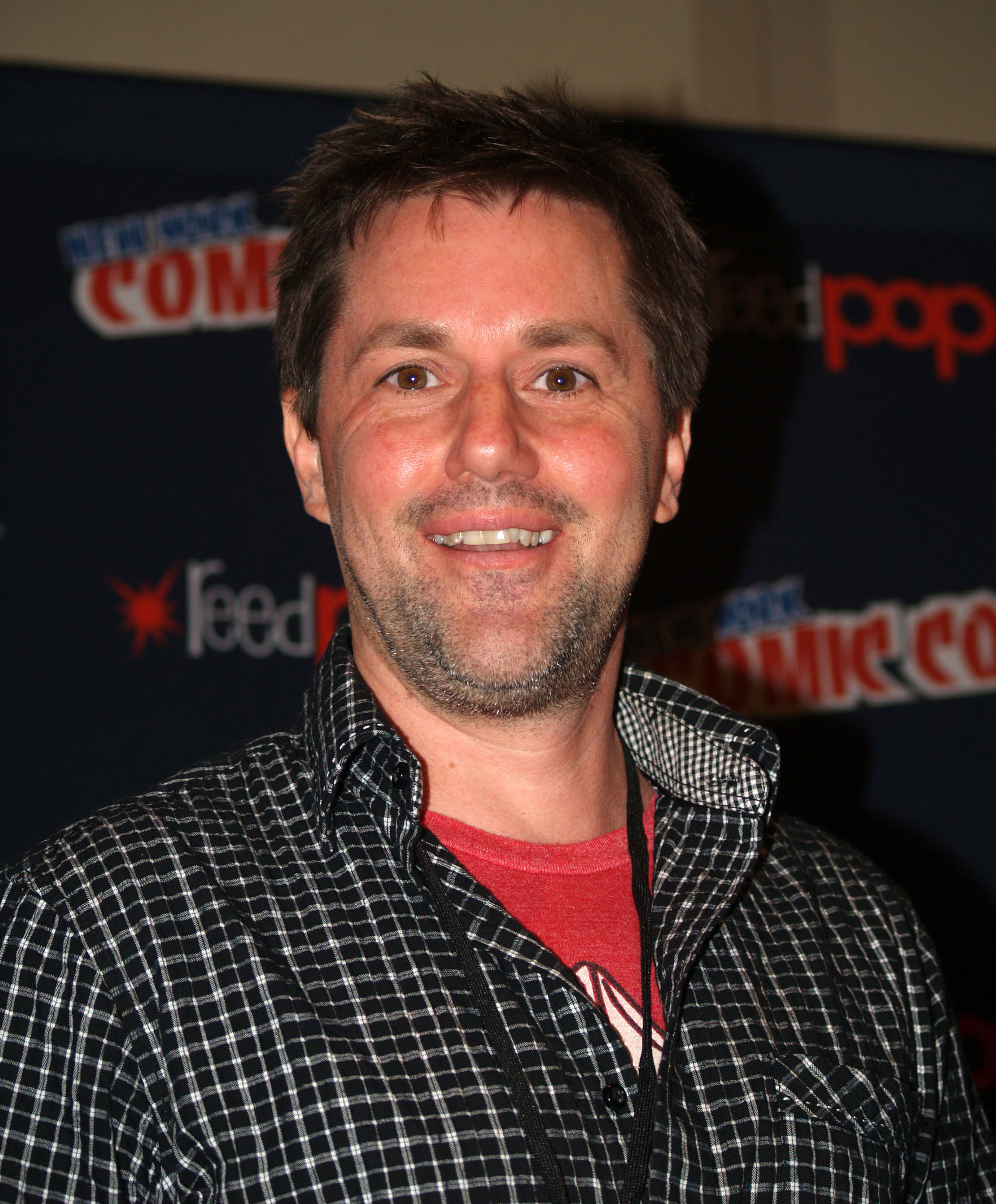
- Ryall at the 2013 New York Comic Con
- Born: Christopher Ryall; 1969 (age 56–57) Long Beach, California, U.S.
- Areas: Writer, Editor
- Awards: Best Editor – Stan Lee's True Believers Awards (2014)

Christopher Ryall (born 1969) is an American comic book writer and editor. He is best known as the former President, Publisher, and Chief Creative Officer of IDW Publishing (2004–2019), and as a writer in the comic book industry. In February 2011, his Eisner Award-nominated series, Zombies vs. Robots, co-created with artist Ashley Wood, was optioned by Sony Pictures for Michael Bay’s Platinum Dunes with Mike Flanagan as director.

== Career ==
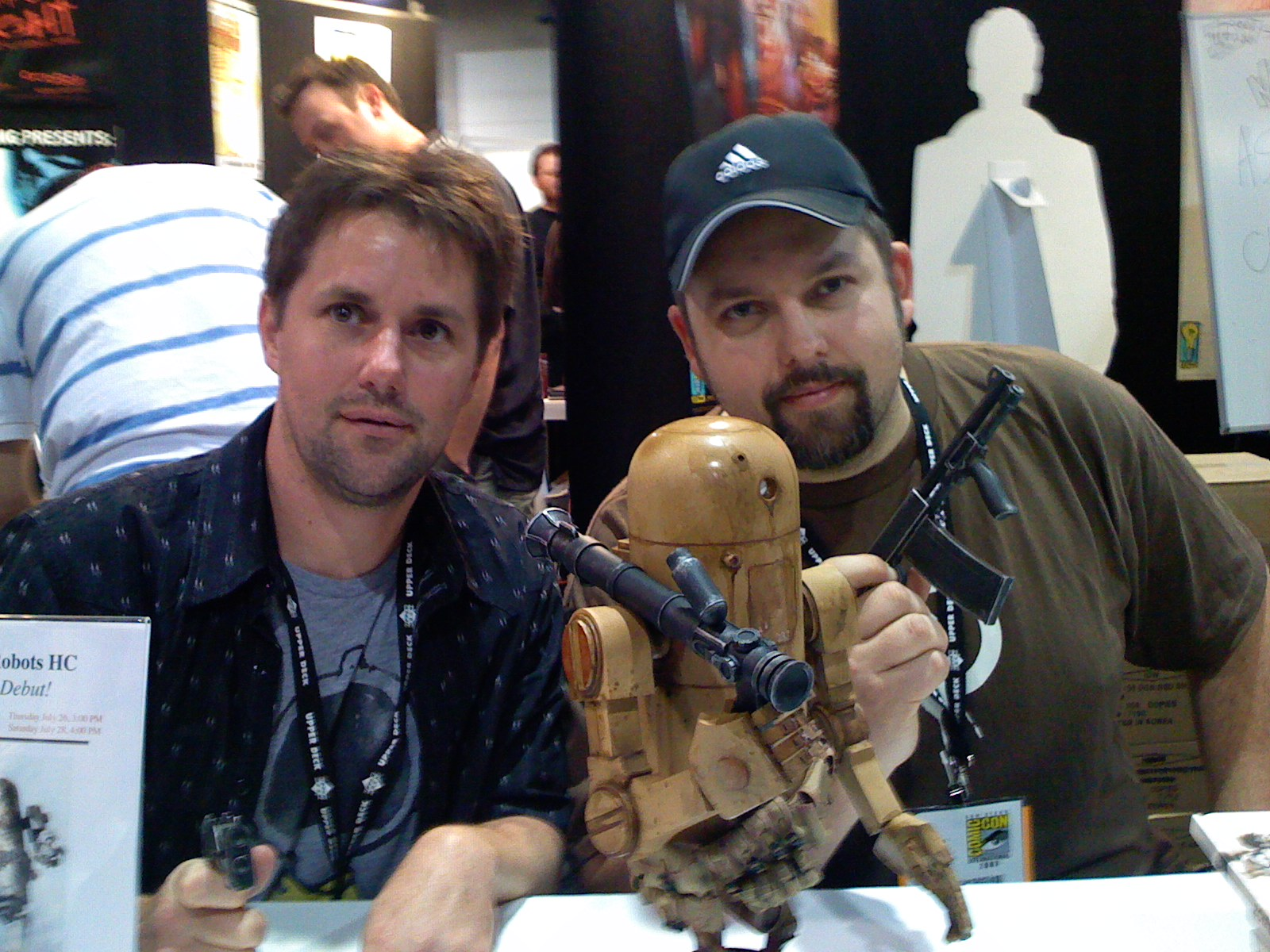
Ryall with Ashley Wood

In 2002, Ryall was hired by filmmaker Kevin Smith to run the entertainment-based MoviePoopShoot.com, one of Smith’s first forays outside of filmmaking. The site originally appeared in Smith's 2001 film, Jay and Silent Bob Strike Back, as a parody site. Ryall, along with webmaster Ming Chen, news writer/editor Scott Tipton and many freelance columnists and cartoonists, launched the site on June 17, 2002. In addition to serving as the site's Editor-in-Chief, Ryall wrote multiple weekly columns for the website, including "One Hand Clapping", "TV Recommendations", "A Night Out", and "TV Pilot Reviews". Ryall continued to run the site after joining IDW in mid-2004. He departed the site altogether in January 2006.

On June 21, 2004, Ryall joined San Diego–based comic-book publisher IDW Publishing as the company's second Editor-in-Chief. Ryall's first published comic-book work as writer with IDW was an adaptation of the film Shaun of the Dead with artist Zach Howard; he also helped launch the horror mag revival Doomed (for which he and artist Ashley Wood received an Eisner nomination for their adaptation of Richard Matheson's "Blood Son" short story), dialoguing the lead character, Ms. Doomed, and writing numerous stories for the magazine's four issues; also, he adapted George A. Romero's Land of the Dead with artist Gabriel Rodriguez; Masters of Horror with artist Jeremy Haun; he co-wrote with Simon Furman the first Transformers film prequel, with artist Don Figueroa; Ryall and Rodriguez again adapted Beowulf; Gene Simmons House of Horrors; a prose short in 30 Days of Night, a DVD pack-in comic for the movie Role Models; and Weekly World News with artist Alan Robinson. He adapted the epic Clive Barker’s The Great and Secret Show with Rodriguez illustrating all 12 issues. Ryall wrote four of the eight issues of IDW's Kiss comic series, with artists Jamal Igle and Wagner Reis, as well as two issues of Kiss Solo, and co-wrote with Tom Waltz four issues of Kiss Kids with artist Jose Holder. Ryall more recently adapted the Stephen King/Joe Hill tribute to Richard Matheson, "Throttle" with artist Nelson Daniel and Matheson's own "Duel" in a book called Road Rage. Ryall spearheaded an inter-company crossover involving Mars Attacks and numerous IDW properties, and wrote two of the issues: Mars Attacks Kiss and Mars Attacks Zombies vs Robots. In 2014, Ryall and Sam Kieth again partnered to launch a four-issue miniseries Mars Attacks: First Born.

Comics series he has created include Zombies vs. Robots (and its sequel Zombies vs. Robots vs. Amazons) both co-created with artist Ashley Wood; Groom Lake (co-created with artist Ben Templesmith); The Colonized with artist Drew Moss; and The Hollows with artist Sam Kieth.

In February 2006, IDW promoted Ryall to Publisher. Among the properties he helped develop and shepherd to IDW Publishing were Hasbro's Transformers, Locke & Key, Toho’s Godzilla, CBS/Paramount's Star Trek, HBO's True Blood and 2000 AD's Judge Dredd. During Ryall's tenure at IDW, the publisher was made a premiere publisher, won their first Eisner Awards, published the first-ever inter-license crossover and the first-ever Doctor Who crossover.

In 2009, Ryall and co-writer Scott Tipton released the prose primer on the comic book industry, Comic Books 101, through IMPACT Publishing. In addition to featuring Ryall and Tipton's overview of comics history and creators, the book features contributions from creators such as Stan Lee, Harlan Ellison, Gene Simmons, Mark Waid, Joe Hill and Brian Lynch.

Independent of IDW Publishing, Ryall published Frank Frazetta’s Neanderthal with Jay Fotos and Tim Vigil, through Image Comics. He also published a short comic-book story with artist Drew Moss, "High Ball on the Low Road," in the Image Comics anthology "Outlaw Western, Vol. 3" (2013). "Outlaw Western" was nominated for a 2014 Eisner Award for Best Anthology.

In October 2010, Ryall contributed a prose story, "Twilight of the Gods", to Classics Mutilated, a prose "monster-lit" anthology, and in 2014, published his first Zombies vs Robots prose story, "Meaner Than a Junkyard Dog", in the anthology Zombies vs Robots: This Means War.

Ryall wrote the first inter-company crossover for IDW in 2011: Infestation, which paired the Transformers, Star Trek, Ghostbusters, and G.I. Joe in an adventure with Ryall's own Zombies vs Robots. He also directly oversaw 2012's Mars Attacks IDW franchise, and wrote two of the issues, Mars Attacks Kiss, and Mars Attacks Zombies vs Robots.

His 2013 to 2014 work includes The Colonized, co-created with artist Drew Moss, The Hollows, co-created with artist Sam Kieth, and Kiss Kids, with co-author Tom Waltz and artist Jose Holder. All three series were published in 2013. In July 2014, Ryall won the Best Editor award at the True Believers Awards (formerly the Eagle Awards) at the London Film & Comic Con.

Ryall wrote four series in 2015: Zombies vs Robots, Dirk Gently's Holistic Detective Agency with artists Tony Akins and Ilias Kyriazis, Onyx, co-created with artist Gabriel Rodriguez, and String Divers with artist Nelson Daniel. That year Ryall was once again named to Bleeding Cool's Top 100 Power List, moving up the rankings to No. 40.

In 2016, Ryall co-wrote Rom the Space Knight.

After Ryall leaving IDW in March 2018 to work at Robert Kirkman's Skybound Entertainment, in December 2018, Ryall returned to IDW to serve as President, Publisher, and Chief Creative Officer. In 2020, Ryall announced that he was stepping down from his duties with IDW in order to work with Ashley Wood again in a new publishing venture called the World of Syzygy, though he would continue as editor of the Locke & Key comic books, and executive producer of the television series.

== Personal life ==
Ryall lives in San Diego with his wife, Julie, and daughter, Lucy.

== Awards and nominations ==
Year	Award Name	Category	Work	Result	Ref
2006	Eisner Award	Best Short Story	"Blood Son" in Doomed #1 - adapted by Ryall (art by Ashley Wood, original story by Richard Matheson)	Nominated	
2008	Eagle Award	Favourite Editor	—N/a	Nominated	
2012	Eagle Award	Favourite Editor	—N/a	Nominated	
2014	True Believer Comic Awards	Favourite Editor	—N/a	Won	
2016	Bram Stoker Award	Best Graphic Novel	Shadow Show: Stories in Celebration of Ray Bradbury (editor with Sam Weller, Mort Castle, & Carlos Guzman)	Won	

== Selected bibliography ==
- Shaun of the Dead (2005)
- Zombies vs. Robots (2005)
- George A. Romero’s Land of the Dead (2005)
- Masters of Horror (2005)
- Doomed (2006)
- Transformers Official Movie Adaptation (2007)
- Clive Barker’s The Great and Secret Show (2007)
- Beowulf Official Movie Adaptation (2007)
- Doomed (2007)
- Zombies vs. Robots vs. Amazons (2008)
- Gene Simmons House of Horrors (2008)
- Zombies vs. Robots Aventure (2009)
- Groom Lake (2009)
- Frank Frazetta’s Neanderthal (2009)
- Role Models; "The Adventures of Booby-Watcher"(2009)
- Comic Books 101: The History, Methods, and Madness (2009)
- Transformers Robot Heroes: I am Optimus Prime (2009)
- Weekly World News (2009)
- Classics Mutilated (2010)
- Zombies vs Robots: UnderCity (2011)
- Infestation: Outbreak (2011)
- Kiss (2011)
- Kiss Solo (2012)
- Mars Attacks Kiss (2012)
- Mars Attacks ZvR (2012)
- Kiss Kids (2013)
- The Colonized (2013)
- The Hollows (2013)
- Mars Attacks: First Born (2014)
- Zombies vs Robots Ongoing (2015)
- Dirk Gently's Holistic Detective Agency (2015)
- Onyx (2015)
- Garbage Pail Kids Go Hollywood [dialogue assist only] (2015)
- String Divers (2015)
- Rom (2016)

== Guest appearances ==
- Mighty Morphin Power Rangers (1993); Extra
- Jersey Girl (2004); Extra
- Beauty and the Geek (2007); Guest judge
- Fictional Frontiers (radio show; since 2009); Bi-weekly guest
- Clarion Science Fiction & Fantasy Writer’s Workshop (2009; 2013); Guest Lecturer
- Dredd Blu-Ray extra feature (2012)
