= Annie Parkhouse =

British comic book letterer

- Born: Annie Halfacree
- Area: Letterer

Annie Parkhouse (née Halfacree) has been one of the leading letterers in British comics for over 30 years.

== Biography ==
Beginning her career working on Lion for IPC magazines, she has since provided dialogue for many DC Comics titles and 2000AD, working on scripts by writers and artists such as Alan Moore and Garry Leach (on Marvelman). Annie has been the recipient of an Eagle Award for her lettering.

Following the death of Tom Frame, Parkhouse became the lead letterer on the Judge Dredd strip and continues to work on other 2000AD stories, Hellblazer, among others.

She is married to British writer/artist Steve Parkhouse.

== Awards ==
Annie has been the recipient of an Eagle Award for her lettering.

== Sources ==
- Annie Parkhouse at the Grand Comics Database
- Annie Parkhouse at the Comic Book DB (archived from the original)
- Annie Parkhouse at 2000 AD online
- Annie Parkhouse at Barney
