= Black Moon Chronicles (video game) =

- Developer: Cryo Interactive
- Publisher: Cryo Interactive
- Engine: Black Moon Chronicles engine
- Platform: Windows
- Release: 1999
- Genre: Strategy
- Mode: Single-player

Black Moon Chronicles (French: Chroniques de la Lune noire) is a 1999 video game by Cryo Interactive, based on the comic book series of the same name.

== Plot ==
The player is Wismerhill, a Half-Elf, who is stuck in the middle of a war between four camps.

== Gameplay ==
The gameplay draws both from the Warcraft and Heroes of Might and Magic series.

== Critical reception ==
According to Cryo Interactive, Black Moon Chronicles was a commercial success, with sales above 100,000 units by September 1999.

JeuxVideo thought the game brought originality to the real-time strategy genre, though thought its interface was too simple. Craig Vaughan of PC Zone negatively compared it to Magic and Mayhem and Warhammer: Dark Omen, though praised its gothic soundtrack. Mithnar of Polish review site Gry Online praised the "active pause" feature.
