= Olivier Ledroit =

French comic book artist (born 1969)

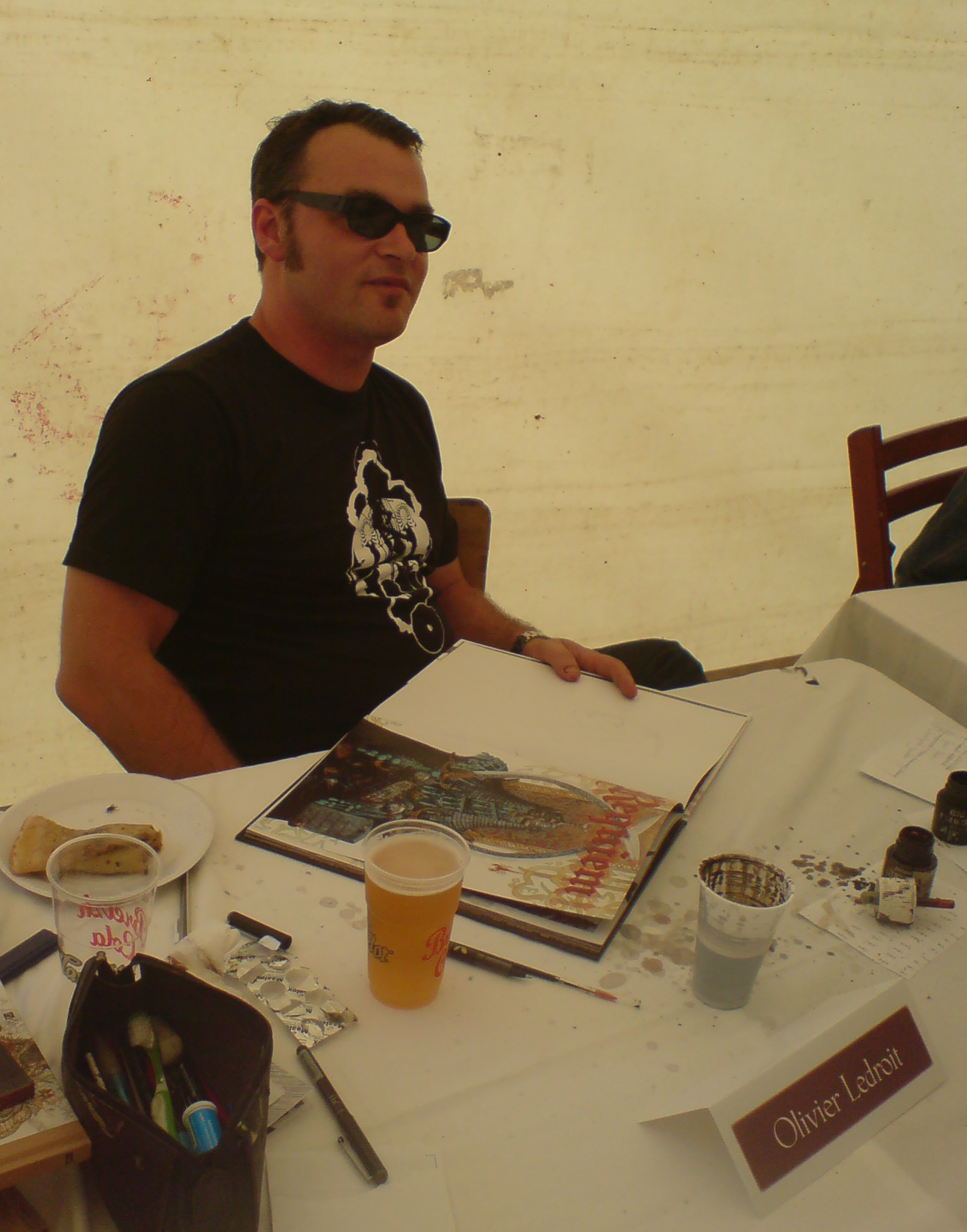
- Olivier Ledroit at the Château de Comper, dedicating his comic books
- Born: 3 June 1969 (age 57) Meaux, France
- Area: Artist
- Notable works: Black Moon Chronicles; Requiem Chevalier Vampire
- Awards: "Favourite European Comics" Eagle Award (2007)

Olivier Ledroit (born 3 June 1969) is a French comic book artist, perhaps best known for his work on the Black Moon Chronicles series. He has also worked on art designs in the Might and Magic franchise.

He has also provided the art for Requiem Chevalier Vampire and Sha, both written by Pat Mills.

== Awards ==
- 2007: Won the "Favourite European Comics" Eagle Award, for Requiem Chevalier Vampire with Pat Mills

== Bibliography ==
- Wika (with Thomas Day: (English Version 2021 ISBN 9781787735927)
- The Fairy Universe (with Laurent Souillé: (English Version 2022 ISBN 978-1-950912-51-3)
- Black Moon Chronicles (with Froideval):
  - "Le signe des Ténèbres"
  - "Le Vent des Dragons"
  - "La marque des démons"
  - "Quand sifflent les Serpents"
  - "La danse écarlate"
- Black Moon's Arcanas (with Froideval):
  - "Ghorghor Bey"
- Sha (with Pat Mills):
  - "The Shadow One" (1995, ISBN 2-87764-565-7)
  - "Soul Wound" (1996, ISBN 2-87764-648-3)
  - "Soul Vengeance" (1997, ISBN 2-87764-819-2)
- Xoco (with Mosdi)
  - "Papillon Obsidienne"
  - "Notre Seigneur l'Ecorche"
- Requiem Chevalier Vampire (with Pat Mills)
  - "Resurrection" (November 2000, ISBN 2-914420-04-8)
  - "Danse Macabre" (September 2001, ISBN 2-914420-01-3)
  - "Dracula" (May 2002, ISBN 2-914420-02-1)
  - "Le Bal des Vampires" (November 2003, ISBN 2-914420-05-6)
  - "Dragon Blitz" (November 2004, ISBN 2-914420-08-0)
  - "Hellfire Club" (November 2005, ISBN 2-914420-12-9)
  - "Le Couvent des soeurs de sang" (February 2007, ISBN 2-914420-19-6)
  - "La Reine des âmes mortes" (November 2008, ISBN 2-914420-23-4)
  - "La Cité des pirates" (November 2009, ISBN 978-2-914420-28-0)
  - "Bain de sang" (2011,ISBN 2914420366))
  - "Amours défuntes" (2012, ISBN 2914420463)
