= Black Moon Chronicles =

French comic book series

Black Moon Chronicles (Chroniques de la Lune Noire)
- Volume 1, Le signe des Ténèbres (Sign of Darkness), showing the armies of the Order of Light, led by Fratus Sinister, under the Black Moon (which appears on all album covers).

Publication information
- Publisher: Zenda Editions (1–4); Dargaud (5–14); Europe Comics (15–22)
- Formats: Original material for the series has been published as a set of graphic novels.
- Original language: French
- Genre: Dark fantasy
- Publication date: May 1989 – present
- Number of issues: 22

Creative team
- Writer(s): François Marcela-Froideval
- Artist(s): Olivier Ledroit (1–5); Cyril Pontet (6–14); Fabrice Angleraud (15–22)

Reprints
- The series has been reprinted, at least in part, in Danish, Dutch, English, German, and Italian.

The Black Moon Chronicles (French: Chroniques de la Lune Noire) is an epic dark fantasy French comic series.

== Publication history ==
Written by François Marcela-Froideval, the Black Moon Chronicles is an epic story offset by liberal doses of irreverent humour and the use of colloquial modern French over the archaic language usually found in such stories.

The series first episode was published in the late 80s. Following its long-lasting success in France, spin-off series were created to give more details on the background of some key characters.

Episode 5 was the last volume drawn by Olivier Ledroit, who was replaced by Cyril Pontet for the rest of the series. Ledroit was still kept on drawing the remaining album covers.

== Key characters ==
- Wismerhill (from "Whispers Hill") – the main character, half-dark elven, with an unknown past and an extraordinary destiny. Formerly a nameless elf, his name was given to him by Heads-or-Tails when he combined the two words of the place he originally came from. He became the new Emperor of Lyhnn after defeating the previous emperor. When he was indoctrinated by the Black Moon, he gained clerical abilities and after defeating an undead prince, he gained the abilities of a magician. To become truly powerful, Haazel Thorn told him to go through the ritual of Negation to be a Lord of Negation but he will lose his humanity permanently. To console him, Hellaynnea suggested they should be married along with 8 other women from different race and tribe to ensure his line will continue. He did so and after that he became a father of 8 daughters and 1 son.
- Haazel Thorn / The Black Moon – an archmage and demigod, claiming to be a god, who extends his power through his own religion. The son of Lucifer, he plots to destroy the Empire of Hagendorf.
- Hagendorf – the former Emperor of Lyhnn, warned by The Oracle about the coming of the "Metal Hound" who will overthrow him. He was fatally wounded by Wismerhill within his own palace. Dying, he issues a prophetic warning that if they keep following Wismerhill, they will bring the world its eternal damnation. His soul was eaten by Haazel Thorn after he died.
- Frater Sinister (also called Fratus) – corrupt and treacherous leader of the Order of Light, he also plots to overthrow the Emperor. He joined Wismerhill to be a vassal due to their mutual hatred of the Empire and was indoctrinated to the Black Moon religion. He still wanted to be Emperor and plotted to overthrow Wismerhill when the time is right. He met his end when he tried to take Hellaynnea to be his mistress in a summoning ritual but was killed by her since he wasn't strong enough to control her due to her new power she gained when she became an empress of hell again.
- Prince Parsifal – commander of the Knights of Justice, devoted to God, allied to the Empire.
- Methraton – the Ultimate Mage, enemy of the gods and ally of Wismerhill, he is the subject of its own spin-off series, Methraton. He hated the Gods because his late master was killed by them eons ago.

Associates of Wismerhill (more developed in the spin-off series Black Moon Arcanas):

- Hellaynnea – a female demon (succubus), who becomes Wismerhill's new lover and eventually his first wife.
- Ghorghor Bey – a gigantic half-ogre, an impressive mass of muscle and brutality.
- Heads-or-Tails – an elven warrior with two magical, intelligent swords (Nepher and Bepher). He was raised by dragons when he was young, then trained in the arts of thievery and swordsmanship by the Thieves Guild.
- Murata – a samurai.
- Shamballeau – a mage, he became Wismerhill's magic teacher after he gained the abilities of a magician.
- Pepette – a young girl and the only person who can control Goum.
- Goum – Pepette's enchanted (and powerful) older brother.
- Feidreiva or Fey – a female-elf archer, and the first love of Wismerhill. Though she died, Wismerhill still loves her more even if he is married to nine beautiful wives.

== Volumes ==
1. Le Signe des Ténèbres (Sign of Darkness, 1989)
2. Le Vent des Dragons (Dragons Wind, 1990)
3. La marque des démons (Mark of the Demons, 1991)
4. Quand sifflent les Serpents (When Snakes Whistle, 1992)
5. La danse écarlate (The Scarlet Dance, 1994)
6. La Couronne des Ombres (Crown of Shadows, 1995)
7. De Vents, de Jade et de Jais (Of Wind, Jade and Jet, 1997)
8. Le Glaive de justice (Sword of Justice, 1999)
9. Les Chants de la négation (Songs of Negation, 2000)
10. L'Aigle foudroyé (Struck Down Eagle, 2002)
11. Ave Tenebrae (Hail Darkness, 2003)
12. La Porte des Enfers (The Door to Hell, 2005)
13. La Prophétie (The Prophecy, 2006)
14. La Fin des Temps (End of Times, 2008)
15. En un jeu cruel (In a Cruel Game, 2011)
16. Terra Secunda 1/2 (Second Country 1/2, 2012)
17. Terra Secunda 2/2 (Second Country 2/2, 2014)
18. Guerres ophidiennes (Ophidian Wars, 2015)
19. Le trône d'Opale (The Opal Throne, 2017)
20. Une semaine ordinaire (Just Another Week, 2018)
21. Une passerelle vers l'enfer (A Gateway to Hell, 2020)
22. Sic Transit Gloria Mundi (Thus Passes the Glory of the World, 2021)
23. La Forteresse d'Opale (The Opal Fortress, 2024)

== Spin-offs ==
=== Black Moon Arcanas (Les Arcanes de la Lune Noire) ===
Each album tells the story of one of the key characters in the main series. The story is by Froideval but each tome has a different artist.

1. Ghorghor Bey (with Ledroit, 2001)
2. Heads-or-Tails (with Fabrice Angleraud, 2007)
3. Parsifal (with Fabrice Angleraud, 2010)
4. Greldinard (with Manuel Morgado, 2017)

=== Methraton ===
Spin-off dedicated to the mysterious Ultimate Mage helping the hero of the Black Moon Chronicles, by Froideval and Fabrice Druet.

1. Le Serpent (The Snake, 2001)
2. Le Crane (The Skull, 2003)
3. Pharaon (Pharaoh, 2006)

== In other media ==
The saga is also the subject of a miniature game and a 1999 RTS videogame, both of the same name. A massive online role playing game, Black Moon Chronicles - Winds of War, was cancelled before finishing production. The Beta game testing client is available for free on Fileplanet.

In January 2007, the Company AmalGame-Online Inc. restarted the development of Black Moon Chronicles – Winds of War. The open beta started at the end of February 2008 and the game was officially launched on May 14.

In March 2012, Amando Blasco from Bruma Studios acquired Black Moon Chronicles – Winds of War from Amalgame-Online, restarting the development of the game and opening a public beta server.
