= Sha (comics) =

- Volume 1, The shadow one, showing the Goddess Sha
- Created by: Pat Mills; Olivier Ledroit

Publication information
- Publisher: Editions Soleil
- Schedule: Annual
Title(s)
The Shadow One
Soul Wound
Soul Vengeance
- Formats: Original material for the series has been published as a set of graphic novels.
- Original language: French
- Genre: Horror
- Publication date: 1996–1997

Creative team
- Writer(s): Pat Mills
- Artist(s): Olivier Ledroit
- Colourist(s): Olivier Ledroit

Reprints
- The series has been reprinted, at least in part, in Dutch and English.
- Collected editions
- Sha L'Intégrale: ISBN 2-87764-939-3
- Sha Collection: ISBN 1932413979

Sha is a Franco-British comic, published by Editions Soleil. It is a trilogy, published from November 1996 to April 1998.

The story is written by Pat Mills and illustrated by Olivier Ledroit. They have also collaborated on Requiem Chevalier Vampire.

== Storyline ==
In France during the 15th century, witch hunting is at its peak. The Inquisition is everywhere. Lara, a sixteen-year-old girl, is sentenced to death. Before she dies she curses her executioners and swears to return to punish them.

In Amerika, New Eden during the 21st century, the goddess Sha strikes inexorably. Her hand takes revenge to all of them who are involved with the death of Lara. Inspector Duffy is assigned to capture Sha but she's puzzled as to why she feels a strange connection to the killer.

== Characters ==
- Lara de Voix: A sixteen-year-old witch sentenced to death by the Inquisition along her parents and her infant son.
- Dominique: Lara's best friend and fellow witch who betrays her.
- The Duke: The nobleman who lead the witch hunt.
- The inquisitor: The priest who sentenced Lara and her family to be burned at the stake.
- The monk: An investigator monk and member of the Inquisition who goaded Lara into sexual intercourse in exchange for saving her son's life, a promise he didn't keep.
- The executioner: A sadistic black robed man who mutilated Lara prior to her burning.
- Sha: A being from the Shadow dimension and, unbeknown to Duffy, her familiar.
- Inspector Duffy: The reincarnation of Lara de Voix. One of New Eden PD finest.
- Policemen Wyler: Duffy's partner and a psychic
- Thomas Adams: The reincarnation of the Duke and a demon, now the world biggest arms' dealer. He sells weapons, including chemical ones, to parties on both sides of conflicts.
- Max Dufere: The reincarnation of the monk and a demon, now the king of the food industry. His chemical-filled products allow the overfeeding of the population, thus sapping most causes of rebellion. He personally conducts the chastity checks of his female employees.
- Madam Messonne: The reincarnation of Dominique, head of the world-ruling demon conspiracy and a demon herself, the world's most famous opera singer. Her performances ridicule her former pagan faith.
- Chief Ofalle: The reincarnation of the executioner and a demon, now head of the NEPD. He has kept his love for gratuitous torture and violence from his former life.
- Priest Grey: The reincarnation of the inquisitor and a demon, now a televangelist and host of the Redemption Show, a religion reality-game show during which people guilty of the crime of cyberpornography are electrocuted through a wheel-of-fortune/electric chair operated by the ones who reported them to the police. His studio also secretly houses the "Queen of Cyberporn", a robot created to head the cyberporn movement and focus most opposition and rebels into an easy controllable ensemble.

== Publications ==
=== French-language edition ===
The French-language volumes, and the collected volume, are all published by Editions Soleil:

Sha (146 pages, 1999, ISBN 2-87764-939-3) collects:

1. "The Shadow One" (46 pages, 1996, ISBN 2-87764-565-7)
2. "Soul Wound" (46 pages, 1996, ISBN 2-87764-648-3)
3. "Soul Vengeance" (46 pages, 1997, ISBN 2-87764-819-2)

=== English-language edition ===
The English-language is published by Heavy Metal and collects all three stories:

- Sha Collection (110 pages, June 2008, ISBN 1-932413-97-9)
