= Astounding Space Thrills =

- Image issue 1 cover by Conley and Steranko
- Author: Steve Conley
- Website: http://www.astoundingspacethrills.com/
- Launch date: 1998
- End date: 2001

Astounding Space Thrills is a science-fiction webcomic by Steve Conley that ran from 1998 until 2001. Consisting of around 500 pages, Conley made use of GIF images and an early precursor to a "share" button while creating Astounding Space Thrills. The webcomic was first published as a comic book series by Image Comics starting in 2000, and it was remastered as a webcomic in 2016.

== Synopsis ==
Astounding Space Thrills follows the adventures of Argosy Smith around the year 2030 as he travels through space on a new type of space ship. He is often accompanied on his adventures by Theremin, formerly a human antique dealer whose body is now composed of "bioglop".

== Development ==
Conley was inspired by 1940s and 1950s science-fiction pulp magazines, comic strips, and television serials such as Flash Gordon, Buck Rogers, Commando Cody, and Rocky Jones, Space Ranger to create his webcomic. The protagonist of Astounding Space Thrills shares his name with the classic pulp magazine Argosy, though his name was initially chosen for its naval definition. In an interview with Sequential Tart, Conley stated that these stories "had a grandeur that modern SF stories lack." The webcomic is presented in black and white because it was illustrated and inked on Conley's Macintosh computer, and this influenced Conley's decision to attach the story to the retro science-fiction genre, which many readers would instinctively link to classic black and white serials and pulps.

The first cover art of Astounding Space Thrills was a digitally painted collaboration between Conley and graphic artist Jim Steranko, with whom he previously worked with on internet and multimedia development. Conley went on to approach the Brothers Hildebrandt, Drew Struzan, and Kelly Freas for subsequent covers.

== Publication ==
The pages of Astounding Space Thrills was originally published online as 468 pixels wide GIF images, to allow it to be self-syndicated while keeping the file size low. Dial-up connections were still the main way to reach the web in the late 1990s, and Conley was primarily concerned with keeping his work available online. He was working with much higher quality images, however, and simply scaled them down as he published them. Because he kept the original files, Conley was able to release higher quality versions of Astounding Space Thrills later on.

Conley created an HTML code which allowed anyone to add the strip to their own website. At one point, well over 30,000 web pages carried Astounding Space Thrills, resulting in over a million views each month.

Image Comics began publishing Astounding Space Thrills as a US comic book series in April 2000. Conley also independently released his webcomic in comic book form in 2003, which he distributed for free at various comic book conventions. In 2008, IDW Publishing published the strip collection Astounding Space Thrills: Argosy Smith and the Codex Reckoning. This edition was nominated for a 2009 Harvey Award for Best Domestic Reprint Project. In 2016, Conley started releasing a remastered version of his webcomic on his personal website.
