= Thomas Boatwright =

American comic book artist and writer

- Born: February 6, 1980 (age 46) North Carolina, U.S.
- Areas: Writer, Artist, Letterer
- Notable works: Howard Lovecraft and the Undersea Kingdom; Zeke Deadwood: Zombie Lawman; Halloween Legion; Dr. Herbert West

Thomas A. Boatwright (born February 6, 1980) is an American comic book artist and writer.

== Career ==
Thomas A. Boatwright's earliest breakthrough into mainstream comics came in 2007, when Image Comics published The Surreal Adventures of Edgar Allan Poo through Jim Valentino's Shadowline imprint. Boatwright's relationship with Shadowline continued with the publication of Cemetery Blues in 2008, a series he co-created with writer Ryan Rubio.

Boatwright and Rubio's next collaboration was Zeke Deadwood: Zombie Lawman published with Slave Labor Graphics in 2009 and 2011.

Following the release of Zeke Deadwood, Boatwright worked on projects with major comics publishers and entertainment companies such as Arcana, Dark Horse Comics, and IDW Comics. Dr. Herbert West & Astounding Tales of Medical Malpractice, published through Arcana Comics, includes a foreword by the noted character actor Jeffrey Combs and The Halloween Legion garnered the attention of Hellboy creator Mike Mignola, who provided a pull quote stating, "I love this stuff."

Boatwright also worked on the "Howard Lovecraft" graphic novels, variously as cover artist and interior artist. The series by writers Bruce Brown and Dwight MacPherson was turned into a series of animated features by Arcana Studio beginning with Howard Lovecraft and the Frozen Kingdom.

== Influences ==
Boatwright's early influences included cartoonists Charles Shultz, Bill Watterson, Charles Addams, and Edward Gorey. Contemporary comic artists Mike Mignola, Eric Powell, and Guy Davis also influenced the development of Boatwright's art style. The mix of influences from traditional cartoonists such as Bill Watterson and horror artists like Mignola can be seen in much of Boatwright's art, which is sometimes described as "creepy but cute."

== Bibliography ==
=== Image Comics ===
- The Surreal Adventures of Edgar Allan Poo (artist, written by Dwight MacPherson, limited series, 2007)
- Cemetery Blues (co-creator and artist, written by Ryan Rubio, limited series, 2008)

=== Dark Horse Comics ===
- The Halloween Legion (artist, with writer Martin Powell, graphic novel, 2013)

=== IDW Comics ===
- In The Dark: A Horror Anthology (writer, artist, letterer with editor Rachel Deering, anthology, 2014)

=== Slave Labor Graphics ===
- Zeke Deadwood: Zombie Lawman (writer and artist, with co-writer Ryan Rubio, limited series, 2009 & 2011)

=== Arcana Comics ===
- Howard Lovecraft and the Frozen Kingdom (cover artist, written by Bruce Brown and Dwight MacPherson, graphic novel, 2010)
- Howard Lovecraft and the Undersea Kingdom (artist, written by Bruce Brown and Dwight MacPherson, graphic novel, 2012)
- Howard Lovecraft and the Kingdom of Madness (artist, written by Bruce Brown, graphic novel, 2014)
- Dr. Herbert West & Astounding Tales of Medical Malpractice (artist, written by Bruce Brown, graphic novel, 2019)
