= Requiem Chevalier Vampire =

Comic book series

- Cover of the Dutch language edition of Requiem, de vampierridder: Verrijzenis (2003 Prestige), art by Olivier Ledroit
- Created by: Pat Mills; Olivier Ledroit

Publication information
- Publisher: Nickel, Glénat
- Schedule: Annual
Title(s)
Resurrection
Danse Macabre
Dracula
Le Bal des Vampires
Dragon Blitz
Hellfire Club
Le Couvent des sœurs de sang
La Reine des Ames Mortes
- Formats: Original material for the series has been published as a set of graphic novels.
- Original language: French
- Genre: Vampire
- Publication date: November 2000 – ongoing
- Number of issues: 12

Creative team
- Writer(s): Pat Mills
- Artist(s): Olivier Ledroit
- Colourist(s): Olivier Ledroit

Reprints
- The series has been reprinted, at least in part, in Dutch and English.
- Collected editions
- Resurrection: ISBN 2-914420-04-8
- Danse Macabre: ISBN 2-91442-001-3
- Dracula: ISBN 2-91442-002-1
- Le Bal des Vampires: ISBN 2-91442-005-6
- Dragon Blitz: ISBN 2-91442-008-0
- Hellfire Club: ISBN 2-91442-012-9
- Le Couvent des soeurs de sang: ISBN 2-91442-019-6
- La Reine des Ames Mortes: ISBN 2-91442-023-4

Requiem Chevalier Vampire (French for Requiem Vampire Knight) is a Franco-British comic originally published by Nickel Editions, with a republication of the series by Glénat. The story was written by Pat Mills, with illustrations by Olivier Ledroit. It was translated into English and published by Heavy Metal magazine in the United States. It was also translated into German and published in Germany by Kult Editions as Requiem Der Vampirritter. The comic was characterized by its extreme violence, with sadomasochism as a common theme and frequent scenes of violent sex.

== History ==
In the hope of breaking into the French comic market, Pat Mills established his own comics publishing company in France, Nickel Editions, along with Jacques Collin and Olivier Ledroit. Jacques Collin had previously founded the company Zenda Editions. Mills and Ledroit had previously worked together on Sha.

Requiem Chevalier Vampire was Nickel's first editing job on comics, and found success in France. As the company had been founded to release Requiem it was financially very fragile, with Mills, Ledroit, and Collin as the only employees. Ledroit made all the blueprints himself with his wife. For this reason, issues had to be released every eight months at first, with more time given to the artists to work only as the comic became more successful. Roughly 30,000 copies of each issue were published, and Nickel subsequently expanded, acquiring offices and a website, and recruited more artists including Adrian Smith and Franck Tacito.

Originally a total of 12 issues were expected, with issues released roughly a year apart; however, the series has been on hiatus since issue 11, published in November 2012. In late June 2022, Mills announced that he had begun writing issues 12 and 13, which would be the final issues. In July 2025, Mills announced that due to how much material he had for issue 13, he has decided to split the volume in two, so that the series will now end with issue 14. He has also announced spin-offs focusing on Otto and Bathory, and is also planning a sequel to Requiem.

== Premise ==
The story is set in a world called Résurrection, which is often called Hell, but also carries some of the characteristics of Purgatory. In Résurrection people are reincarnated into monsters according to the sins or otherwise of their life. The lowest ranks are formed by zombies and Kobolds whilst vampires form the elite of the society and the ruling class. There is an inverted concept of justice, in that the more sinful a person was in life, the more they are rewarded in Résurrection. Résurrection has a similar shape as Earth, but everything appears to be the opposite way around to Earth: land has replaced the oceans, while Earth's continents are occupied by perpetual fire and time flows backwards. People do not age, but rejuvenate until they become a foetus and are forgotten; their memory follows the same cycle and is "lost" as people get younger. To avoid total insanity during this process, Résurrection's residents are addicted to a drug based on black opium. People do not land on Résurrection in the same order that they died.

The protagonist is a German soldier during World War II named Heinrich Augsburg, who is killed on the Eastern Front facing the Soviet Army. He is sent to Résurrection after his death and attacked by a mob of zombies. During the confrontation he meets and befriends a vampire who calls himself Otto von Todt. Otto reveals he is a vampire and explains that now Heinrich has become a vampire as well. As the story progresses, Heinrich (now known as Requiem) discovers the world of Résurrection, its people and politics. However, he is single-mindedly focused on rescuing a woman he loved during his lifetime, who he knows by the name of Rebecca.

== Publications ==
=== French-language edition ===
Nickel Editions:

- Box of Volume 1–3 (January 13, 2005, ISBN 2-914420-03-X):
  - "Résurrection" (48 pages, November 2000, ISBN 2-914420-04-8)
  - "Danse macabre" (47 pages, September 2001, ISBN 2-914420-01-3)
  - "Dracula" (48 pages, May 2002, ISBN 2-914420-02-1)
- Box of Volume 4–6 (December 17, 2006, ISBN 2-914420-14-5)
  - "Le Bal des vampires" (45 pages, November 2003, ISBN 2-914420-05-6)
  - "Dragon Blitz" (47 pages, November 2004, ISBN 2-914420-08-0)
  - "Hellfire Club" (47 pages, November 2005, ISBN 2-914420-12-9)
- "Le Couvent des Sœurs de Sang" (49 pages, February 2007, ISBN 2-914420-19-6)
- "La Reine des âmes mortes" (46 pages, November 2008, ISBN 2-914420-23-4)
- "La Cité des pirates" (50 pages, November 2009, ISBN 978-2-914420-28-0)
- "Bain de sang" (2011,ISBN 2914420366))
- "Amours défuntes" (2012, ISBN 2914420463)

Glénat Editions:

- "Résurrection" (2016, ISBN 2344013555)
- "Danse macabre" (2016, ISBN 2344014004)
- "Dracula" (2016, ISBN 2344014012)
- "Le bal des vampires" (2016, ISBN 9782344014028)
- "Dragon Blitz" (2017, ISBN 2344014039)
- "Hellfire Club" (2017, ISBN 2344014047)
- "Le couvent des soeurs de sang" (2018, ISBN 9782344014080)
- "La reine des âmes mortes" (2021, ISBN 2344014098)
- "La cité des pirates" (2021, ISBN 2344014101)
- "Bain de sang" (2022, ISBN 234401411X)
- "Amours défuntes" (2023, ISBN 2344014128)
- "La chute de Dracula" (2024, ISBN 2344014136)

=== English-language translations ===
The series was translated into English and published in Heavy Metal between March 2003 and March 2012:

1. "Resurrection" (Volume 27 number 1, March 2003)
2. "Danse Macabre" (Volume 28 number 1, March 2004)
3. "Dracula" (Volume 28 number 6, January 2005)
4. "The Vampire Ball" (Volume 30 number 2, May, 2006)
5. "Dragon Blitz" (Volume 31 number 2, May, 2007)
6. "Hellfire Club" (Vol. 32 No. 2, May 2008)
7. "Requiem" (Vol. 33 No. 3, May 2009)
8. "Requiem" (Vol. 34 No. 1, March 2010)
9. "Pirate City" (Vol. 35, No. 1, March 2011)
10. "Blood Bath" (Vol. 36, No. 1, March 2012)
11. "Amores Defuntes" Heavy Metal Magazine failed to publish this volume in 2013 for unknown reasons.

They are collecting these stories in trade paperbacks (three to each volume):

- Requiem:
  - Resurrection (144 pages, May 2009, ISBN 1-935351-01-X)
  - Volume 2 (144 pages, January 2010, ISBN 1-935351-18-4)

Panini Comics are also collecting the stories into trade paperbacks (two to each volume):

- Tome 1: Resurrection & Danse Macabre (112 pages, September 2009, ISBN 978-1-84653-437-9)
- Tome 2: Dracula & The Vampires Ball (112 pages, September 2009, ISBN 978-1-84653-438-6)
- Tome 3: Dragon Blitz & Hellfire Club (112 pages, November 2010, ISBN 978-1-84653-457-7)
- Tome 4: The Convent of the Sisters of Blood & The Queen of Dead Souls (112 pages, November 2010, ISBN 978-1-84653-458-4)
- Tome 5: The City of Pirates & Blood Bath (112 pages, November 2011, ISBN 978-1-84653-496-6)
- Tome 6: Deceased Loves (100 pages, announced for October 2017 but not released, ISBN 978-1-84653-671-7)

=== Dutch-language translations ===
The series is being translated into Dutch and the volumes are published by Prestige in the series "Requiem, de vampierridder"

1. "Verrijzenis" (Number 1, 2003)
2. "Dans met de dood" (Number 2, 2003)
3. "Dracula" (Number 3, 2003)
4. "Bal der vampiers" (Number 4, 2004)
5. "Dragon Blitz" (Number 5, 2005)
6. "Hellfire Club" (Number 6, 2006)
7. "Het klooster der Bloedzusters" (Number 7, 2008)
8. "De koningin der dode zielen" (Number 8, 2010)
9. "De stad der piraten" (Number 9, 2011)
10. "Bloedbad"(Number 10, 2012)
11. "Oude liefde" (Number 11, 2013)

== Claudia Chevalier Vampire ==
Claudia Chevalier Vampire is a separate story featuring Lady Claudia. It takes place in the same world as Requiem Chevalier Vampire and adds new characters to the story. Pat Mills writes the story while illustrations are drawn by Franck Tacito. It is translated in German and published in Germany by Kult Editions as Claudia Der Vampirritter. This series is also translated in Dutch and published in the Netherlands by Prestige as Claudia de vampierridder.

=== Publications ===
1. "La Porte des Enfers" (46 pages, December 2004, ISBN 2-914420-07-2) {Heavy Metal 2006 Halloween Issue}
2. "Femmes violentes" (46 pages, December 2006, ISBN 2-914420-18-8) {Heavy Metal 2009 (Fall) Terror Special}
3. "Opium rouge" (48 pages, November 2007, ISBN 978-2-914420-22-8) {Heavy Metal 2010 (Fall) Fright Special}
4. "La Marque de la Bête" (ISBN 978-2-344-01417-2)
5. “La nuit du loup-garou” (ISBN 978-2-344-01418-9)

== Awards ==
- 2007: Won the "Favourite European Comics" Eagle Award
