= The Venger: Dead Man Rising =

Publication information
- Publisher: Ronin Studios
- Schedule: Irregular
- Genre: Superhero
- Publication date: June 2005 – present
- No. of issues: 2

Creative team
- Written by: Matthew Spatola
- Artist(s): Jason Ossman (#1); Tim Baskin (#2)
- Letterer(s): Brant Fowler

The Venger: Dead Man Rising is an independent American comic book series, written and created by Matthew Spatola. The first issue featured artwork by Jason Ossman and John West. The second issue featured full art by Tim Baskin. The series is published by Ronin Studios.

== Awards ==
In 2010 the series was nominated for an Eagle Award in the category "Favorite American Black and White Comic Book".
