= Ogre (magazine) =

Defunct science fiction/fantasy magazine 1979-1989

- Three issues of Ogre
- Editor: Andrew Andrews
- Founded: 1979
- Final issue Number: 1989; 7

Ogre was a small press science fiction/fantasy magazine produced between 1979 and 1989.

== History ==
While students at Temple University, Andrew Andrews and Carl Spicer attended a science fiction convention in 1978 that featured as guests speakers the then relatively unknown writers Joan Vinge and George R.R. Martin. Inspired by what they heard, Andrews and Spicer decided to start up a science fiction/fantasy magazine. Spicer rounded up some contributors, which included artist Dave Stembel for the cover art, writer Tony Russo and illustrator Lori Gajewski. The result was Ogre, a 28-page offset-printed magazine of short science fiction and fantasy stories, art, reviews of books, comics and movies, reports from fantasy gaming conventions, poetry, and interviews. Later editions would expand to 48 pages.

Some of the authors interviewed included L. Sprague deCamp, Ben Bova, Stephen Donaldson, and Robert Sheckley. Story contributors included Dave Nalle and Tony Russo.

Andrews and Spicer produced three issues while still at Temple, then continued to produce it at irregular intervals after graduation, publishing four more issues by 1989. Spicer became a social worker in Philadelphia and contributed to the magazine via mail, while Andrews moved to New Holland, Pennsylvania and carried most of the load of publishing the magazine.

In 1989, Andrews was tapped to become the editor of a new magazine, True Review, and shut down Ogre after Issue 7.

== Reception ==
In Issue 40 of Science Fiction Review (August 1981), Richard E. Geis called this "nicely put together, with good to fine artwork, and some interesting writing. I found the interviews ... of major interest. The poetry was awful." Geis concluded, "Ogre covers a lot of bases but doesn't score many runs."

In Issue 13 of Abyss, Dave Nalle noted that this was "rather nicely done ... it looks very nice." Nalle concluded, "On the whole, the magazine is quite impressive."
