= Tom Frame (letterer) =

British comic letterer (1931–2006)

Tom Frame (1931 – 14 July 2006) was a British comics letterer. He created dialogue for the majority of the Judge Dredd strips, as well as other stories including over 300 stories in 2000 AD, Transformers and Sonic the Comic.

Frame used a combination of computer-based techniques, including a personal font based on his own hand-drawn lettering, and old-fashioned craft like cutting speech balloons by hand. He was acknowledged by several other letterers (for instance, Richard Starkings) for his help in getting them started in the profession.

According to artist Mike Collins (Judge Dredd, Rogue Trooper), "Good lettering has character, adds character to the story. In the UK, a Judge Dredd story just ISN'T a Dredd story without Tom Frame's lettering. Tom's no-nonsense, finely spaced, tall text is as much a part of Mega City One's environment as Dredd's helmet or badge."

Frame died of cancer on 14 July 2006. Prog 1508 had a centrepiece tribute to him with contributions from 37 artists and two colourists, including a drawing by Frame's grandson. John Wagner dedicated Judge Dredd: Dark Justice (2015) to Frame saying that his "lettering always did Dredd justice."
