= Arthur Ranson =

English comic book illustrator

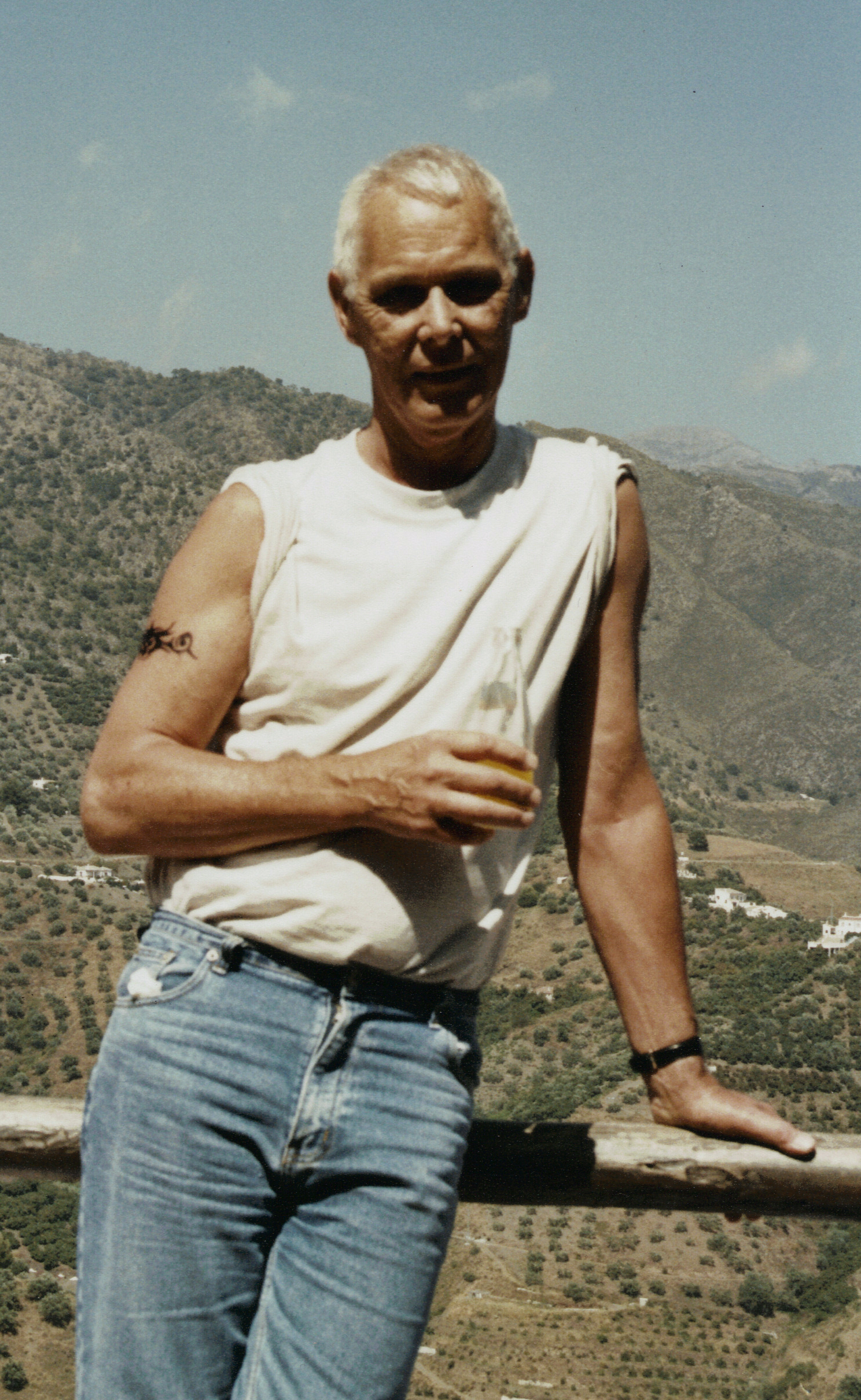
- Arthur Ranson in 2004
- Born: Arthur James Ranson; June 3, 1939 (age 87) Essex, UK
- Area: Artist
- Notable works: Various for Look-in, Anderson: Psi Division; Button Man

Arthur James Ranson (born 1939) is an English comic book illustrator, known for his work on Look-in, Anderson: Psi Division, Button Man and Mazeworld. His work on Cassandra Anderson has been called "photo-realistic".

== Early life ==
Born in 1939, Ranson's childhood and formative years included access to the influences of art and artists in a mixture of British and American comics, including "[The] Beano, Knockout, [The] Dandy, Film Fun, Wizard, Hotspur..., The Eagle with Frank Hampson setting new standards. Wayne Boring's Superman, C.C. Beck's Captain Marvel," and others (including, "[l]ater, John Buscema's Silver Surfer and his Conan, Jack Kirby's Thor"). He says that Hampson in particular was an early influence, but that

Finding Al Williamson's work changed my approach because he did not do comic book drawings but just drew well using his own natural line. He replaced Frank Hampson for me as a spur when I started drawing.

Ranson attended the South West Essex Technical College and School of Art in Walthamstow, Essex, where he studied painting and printmaking. Trained initially as an "apprentice stamp and banknote designer" in the 1960s, learning "to translate photographs into watercolour... in stamp size." A "rare ability at the time," he would later use this skill as a "selling point" when pursuing a career "as an illustrator in advertising and publishing."

== Career ==
After a period of time as a "lettering artist for a cardboard box manufacturer", followed by teaching work, he says he "ran away to London." After some time in menial jobs, Ranson gained experience as a "general patcher-up and filler-in at a commercial art studio," where he was encouraged to become a freelance artist by, he recalls

a visiting commercial artist who said if I went freelance with him he could give me lots of work. I did, he didn't. Then I really became freelance.

Ranson has a son, Jonas, who is also an artist, and daughter, Cassandra.

=== Look-in ===
Ranson first brought the precise techniques he had evolved through his apprenticeship to the UK TV comic Look-in, working first on portrait covers, and later alongside other major comics artists such as John M. Burns, Martin Asbury, Harry North, Colin Wyatt, John Bolton, Jim Baikie, Phil Gascoine, Barry Mitchell, and Bill Titcombe.

After some time drawing "funnies", Ranson drew on his skill in translating pictures across mediums (generally using a Grant Projector, which "projects an image up onto a glass plate, on which one places tracing paper"), and brought his talents to bear for Look-in by creating strips based on such popular TV series as Sapphire and Steel and Danger Mouse, all written by Angus Allan. Since these works were based on specific TV shows, he says that "it seemed important that the characters looked as much like the actors as possible", and thus "used the methods I knew" to achieve the accurate likenesses that typify his work.

=== Musical strips ===
Ranson also produced a series of comic-strip biographies of well-known music stars and bands, including ABBA (1977), Elvis Presley (1981), The Beatles (1981-2), Haircut One Hundred (1983) and The Sex Pistols (1983). Most biographical articles on Ranson date his Beatles work to "the 1960s," but Ranson himself dispels this myth by stating that the "first auto-biographical [sic] strip I did was ABBA." In fact that work was done in 1981.

Ranson recalls that Look-in editor Colin Shelbourne was convinced to allow Allan and Ranson to "retain... the copyright" to their Elvis and Beatles strips, which had the unfortunate side-effect of delaying complete publication, since such deals were largely unheard of. Ranson says:

When he realised, I believe the marketing director was not happy about that and scrapped the plans to bring it out complete. Publishers Ehapa of Stuttgart did in 1995, and Like of Helsinki in 1996.

Ranson describes Shelbourne as "an adventurous editor," who went the extra mile and even allowed the writer and artist to "go to Liverpool for research" for the Beatles strip.

=== TV strips ===
==== Sapphire & Steel ====
Ranson's best-known work for Look-in consisted largely of adaptations of two strips based upon totally different British television programmes. The first of these was a strip based on P. J. Hammond's Sapphire & Steel, which Ranson was "the first and only one to draw" between 1979 and 1981. Scripted by Angus Allan (almost Look-ins sole writer, according to Ranson), Ranson barely recalls drawing the strip, but does remember that

it was in a Sapphire & Steel script that for the first time I drew a frame that spread right across the page. I had never seen it done before and there were doubts expressed about it by [editor] Colin [Shelbourne]."

Ranson was denied the chance to meet Sapphire & Steel star Joanna Lumley by being absent when she visited the offices. He recalls that, unfortunately, while "she was kind enough to offer to meet me and pose for more photo-reference," "someone told her that no, that would not be necessary. Stupid sods."

In 2007, Prion Books reprinted a selection of material from Look-in, and included a three-part Sapphire & Steel story on pages 132-133, 136-137 and 140-141.

==== Danger Mouse ====
Ranson's other famous strip for Look-in was Danger Mouse, an unlikely children's cartoon hero based - loosely - on the Patrick McGoohan TV series Danger Man, created in cartoon mouse form by Cosgrove Hall and voiced on TV by David Jason. Ranson says that he "did enjoy it at the time," and was awarded not only the "Good Grief Oh Crikey" Award from Cosgrove Hall ("The award is a painted model of Dangermouse in heroic pose with a nervous Penfold peering from behind him"), but also received an award from the Society of Strip Illustration for his work on the strip.

Ranson wryly notes that "the reflected glory from the highly popular TV show made me a big hit with my daughter's primary school friends too."

==== Other ====
Between 1977 and 1990, Ranson also produced strips based on such TV properties as Worzel Gummidge, Michael Bentine's Potty Time, Duckula (another Cosgrove Hall character whose comics adventures began in Look-in, but also spun off into its own title), The Bionic Woman and The A-Team, and others. He also produced comic strips based on the TV adaptations of Richmal Crompton's "Just William" novels, Buck Rogers and the film Logan's Run.

Ranson also worked briefly for Marvel UK in the late 1980s, and even illustrated a couple of issues of the comics adventures of Dr. Who for Doctor Who Magazine in 1990.

=== Advertising ===
Aside from his Look-in and (later) 2000AD comics work, Ranson also produced illustrations for Fiesta and some "advertising work through an agent, [including] some All-Bran adverts." He produced some assorted work for various other IPC magazines in addition to 2000AD, and was glad of the "more challenging" work to be found in comics, branding himself "too sensitive a plant to get on in advertising despite the high fees."

Ranson stresses the influence of his peers - particularly Brian Bolland - on his own evolution as an artist, moving from being burdened by the "British way of drawing adventure comics... dependable, professional, craftsmanlike and worthy," to seeing and being influenced by work that "looked as though [the artist, particularly Bolland] really cared about it."

=== 2000 AD ===
Ranson stresses the importance of artist Brian Bolland, saying that:

By seeming to invest more of himself than just his time Brian made the profession attractive to artists who wanted to be more than just journeymen. He, and the people he influenced to be original, influenced me.

In 1989, Ranson followed in Bolland—and others'—footsteps, and moved to major British science fiction comic anthology 2000 AD, with rare forays into the world of American comics, including Batman and the X-Men. On his work with writers he says:

The universe has been kind to me: Angus Allen, John Wagner and Alan Grant. 99.99% of the work has been with these writers. Inventive, professional, prolific, original, idiosyncratic and inventive writers who know how comic strip works.

=== Judge Anderson: Psi Division ===
Ranson's first work for 2000 AD was a one-off Judge Dredd story "Dungeon Master" by John Wagner. It was followed by the ten-part Anderson: Psi Division - "Triad" storyline, which started in Prog #635 (15 July, 1989). David Bishop, in the 2000 AD history volume Thrill Power Overload says that Ranson's

Sample of Arthur Ranson's art on Judge Anderson story The Jesus Syndrome.

photo-realistic style brought a new vitality to psi-judge Cassandra Anderson... [and] was the start of a fruitful creative partnership between Ranson and Grant."

A spin-off from Judge Dredd (on which Ranson would later work), Cassandra Anderson is a Judge with psychic skills, including telepathy and precognition.

Over the next fifteen years, Ranson drew a dozen more serials featuring Judge Anderson, working with writer Alan Grant, who says that since their first collaboration

I've always felt Arthur was the perfect Anderson artist... Some of her best stories were the ones he and I collaborated on. Arthur told each story in a way few others could.

Asked about the changes Anderson had undergone during his 15-years working on her stories, Ranson believed that she had indeed changed

and not just her hairstyle, which has altered at least four times just in my drawing... It seems to me she is not less idealistic so much as less hopeful, she expects less. ...I had thought that Cassandra had become less cheeky, less likely to make jokes, but that was probably lack of opportunity [in various storylines].

Ranson admits to feeling "quite possessive of her", and considers her "the most human of any comic hero I am aware of, and [one who] deals with some of the knottier problems of being human – morality, mortality, meaning." He is especially fond of working on stories in which Anderson is "aware of" her age (of "being between forty and fifty years old") while still "retain[ing her] likeness and... glamour."

=== Button Man ===
In 1990, 2000 AD stalwarts Kevin O'Neill, Pat Mills, John Wagner, Alan Grant and Mike McMahon were invited by Geoff Fry to begin work on a publication for Neptune Distribution. Neptune had acquired premiere British fanzine Fantasy Advertiser in 1988, and sold-out an issue featuring Mills & O'Neill's Marshal Law, prompting the move towards creating a line of comics spearheaded by that character.

Having formed an imprint – Apocalypse Ltd – the publish the new anthology title, Pat Mills found himself de facto editor of the in-preparation title, now called Toxic!. Amid some turmoil, the initial five creators began to splinter, with Wagner in particular feeling that his "style, the way I write, had itself been deemed un-Toxic!" The strip he had spent some time working on was vetoed by Mills, who felt that it was "far too close to 2000 AD in style." It eventually fell to the new editor - Dan Abnett, head-hunted from Marvel UK - to inform Wagner. He recalls that "by that stage Arthur Ranson had drawn an awful lot of it."

The strip – called Button Man – was shelved half-finished. Toxic! was cancelled in October, 1991 after 31 issues.

In the spring of 1992, as part of a promotion called "the Mega-Blast," Button Man was resurrected and launched in Prog 780. Ultra-violent and one of the first non-science fictional strips to appear in the comic's 15-year history, Button Man was one of the very few creator-owned strips to appear in 2000 AD. Then-editor Steve MacManus sums it up by saying

Quality wise, it fit very well in the comic... Subject wise it wasn't a great fit. If you consider 2000 AD's premise was future fantasy. Then again, the weekly had the confidence to carry a story that was the exception to the rule.

Ranson says that:

I really got into but was conscious of making an effort to make it more earthbound. It was a good story and I did not want it to be just another piece of comic book casual violence.

The first Button Man serial was collected in 1994 by Kitchen Sink Press, and again by Rebellion in 2003. Ranson remembers that he "[made] a small change to the end of Button Man," but praises Wagner's storytelling abilities, for being "self-contained. Complete in themselves, neat, compact and satisfying, solid." A second story followed in 1994, and the third made its debut "after an absence of six years" in 2001. Writer John Wagner candidly stated that he believes "My writing and Arthur's art were patchier on the third series, but I believe the plot was the best of the three."

In 2007, Wagner wrote a fourth series, as well pursuing prospects for a big screen adaptation of the series.

=== Other comics work ===
In 1993, Grant and Ranson contributed the two-part story "Tao" to DC Comics' Batman: Legends of the Dark Knight series (issues #52-53).

In 1997, Ranson provided the artwork for a one-shot prestige-format single issue for DC Comics, Batman/Phantom Stranger. Written by one of Ranson's frequent collaborators, Alan Grant (a mainstay at 2000 AD, and also a major contributor to the Batman mythos), the story saw the two characters team-up to "solve the mystery of a missing civilization." Grant and Ranson had previously produced "an outline of a Phantom Stranger story [Ranson] wanted to draw," but were rebuffed. Indeed, Ranson recalls that Grant was asked to write in Batman/Phantom Stranger a Stranger who "must do nothing spooky."

He worked on a number of X-Men-related comics for Marvel. However, he says that he does not "believe my style suits superheros [sic]," and did not enjoy working from scripts written by American writers who, he felt must have "watched too much television as children," peppering their scripts with TV/film terminology and tropes.

== Cameos ==
Due to his use of photographs as reference materials, Ranson has included cameos of friends, colleagues and family in several of his stories. Examples include:

- Angus P Allan: The Look-in writer and Ranson collaborator on (particularly) Sapphire & Steel and Dangermouse, recalls being included in an episode of Sapphire & Steel - "One of the strips featured the 'ghost' of a French naval lieutenant of Bonaparte's time, and Arthur included drawings of me."
- Sue and Alan Grant: Ranson included their faces in Anderson: Psi Division - "Satan"...
- Arthur Ranson: ...Ranson also included his "own head... in the pile of corpses that Satan imagines," in the same story.
- Dez Skinn: Appeared in Button Man.
- Peter Hogan: Appeared in Button Man.
- Edward Berridge: Appeared in Anderson, Psi - "Half Life"

== Bibliography ==
Comics work includes:

- Sapphire & Steel (in Look-In, 1979)
- Anderson: Psi Division (with Alan Grant):
  - "Triad" (in 2000 AD #635-644, 1989)
  - Shamballa (June 2008, 224 pages, Rebellion, ISBN 978-1-905437-67-2):
    - "Shamballa" (in 2000 AD #700-711, 1990)
    - "Reasons to Be Cheerful" (in Judge Dredd Megazine vol. 2 #10, 1992)
    - "The Witch?" (in Judge Dredd Megazine vol. 2 #14, 1992)
    - "Jesus Syndrome" (in Judge Dredd Megazine vol. 2 #22-24, 1993)
    - "Satan" (in Judge Dredd Megazine vol. 3 #1-7, 1995)
    - "The Protest" (in Judge Dredd Megazine vol. 3 #14, 1996)
    - "R*Evolution" (in 2000 AD #1263-1272, 2001)
  - "Postcards from the Edge" (Part 4) (in Judge Dredd Megazine vol. 2 #53, 1994)
  - "Half-Life" (in Judge Dredd Megazine #214-217, 2004)
  - "WMD" (in Judge Dredd Megazine #221-226, 2004)
  - "Lock-in" (in Judge Dredd Megazine #227-230, 2005)
  - "City Of Dead" (in Judge Dredd Megazine #231-236, 2005)
  - "Lucid" (in Judge Dredd Megazine #238-241, 2005)
- "Fellow Travellers" (with Andrew Cartmel, in Doctor Who Magazine #164-166, 1990)
- Button Man (with John Wagner):
  - "Book I: The Killing Game" (in 2000 AD #780-791, 1992, tpb, 88 pages, Kitchen Sink Press, May 1994, ISBN 0-87816-276-3, Rebellion Developments, hardcover, August 2003, ISBN 1-904265-05-7, softcover, January 2007, ISBN 1-905437-19-6)
  - "Book II: The Confession of Harry Exton" (in 2000 AD #904-919, 1994, tpb, 112 pages, Rebellion, August 2003, ISBN 1-905437-70-6)
  - "Book III: Killer Killer" (in 2000 AD prog 2001 & #1223-1233, 2001)
- Mazeworld (with Alan Grant, tpb, 192 pages, Rebellion, November 2011, ISBN 1-907992-48-0):
  - "Book One" (in 2000 AD #1014-1023, 1996)
  - "Book Two" (in 2000 AD #1101-1110, 1998)
  - "Book Three" (in 2000 AD #1151-1160, 1999)
- Batman: Legends of the Dark knight #52-53 (with Alan Grant, DC Comics, 1993)
- Batman: Dark Knight Gallery (DC Comics, 1996)
- Batman/Phantom Stranger (with Alan Grant, one-shot, DC Comics, 1997)
- X-Factor (with Jeff Jensen, 4-issue mini-series, Marvel Comics, 2002)
- X-Treme X-Posé (with Chris Claremont, 2-issue mini-series, Marvel Comics, 2003)
- Soldier X #9-10 (with Karl Bollers, Marvel Comics, 2003)
