= Mazeworld =

- Cover to a collected edition of Mazeworld; Art by Arthur Ranson

Publication information
- Publisher: Originally IPC Media (Fleetway) until 1999, thereafter Rebellion Developments
- First appearance: 2000 AD #1014 (1996)
- Created by: Alan Grant (writer); Arthur Ranson (artist)

Mazeworld is a fantasy story created by Alan Grant and Arthur Ranson for British science fiction comic anthology 2000 AD. It ran in three parts between 1996 and 1999.

== Overview ==
Adam Cadman is the first man to be hanged in Britain since 1964 but just as he is about to die he awakens in a world where both architecture and ethos are based in mazes. In this new world he is unable to remove the hood and noose of the condemned man and is taken to be the awaited folk hero 'The Hooded Man' which leads him into becoming involved in a plot to overthrow the tyrant Maze-Lord Maskul in a series of adventures involving treachery and magic.

2000 AD publishers Rebellion republished the complete story in a collected edition in November 2011.

== Background ==
Mazeworld, initially conceived for Toxic!, was created five years before its initial debut in 2000 AD Prog 1014. Ranson remembers that

initially Alan just wrote an opening chapter with a man being hanged and finding himself in a world of mazes. That was all he had, no idea then of what came next. Excited by this I wrote reams of ideas to Alan which I do not know now if he used or not.

In 1996, then-2000 AD editor David Bishop, partly to challenge the status-quo, and partly in the wake of the "definite anti-Dredd feeling within Fleetway [then publishers of 2000 AD]" after the Judge Dredd film decided to replace fictional editor Tharg the Mighty with 'The Man in Black from Vector 13', and move Dredd himself from his "familiar position as the first strip in each prog." Mazeworld took Dredd's place.

A fantasy epic, it was the "first new work Grant had done in years for 2000 AD" (in part because of his work on Batman for DC Comics), and Grant recalls that "the strip offered a chance to experiment while collaborating with Ranson." Designed to play to Ranson's strengths — Grant remembers that Ranson even "dr[ew] a "map" of Mazeworld... [that] was so good, so right, that it basically became the template for everything that followed." Grant is quoted in Thrill-Power Overload as saying that:

People criticise Arthur for using photo reference, but he's a brilliant storyteller. On Mazeworld I gave him the choice [of] what kind of story he wanted. He asked for serious fantasy, no humour.

Grant believes that these terms hampered the strip, calling it "a hiding to nothing," and while praising Ranson, who "turned in really nice art," he believes the story "didn't take off."

Nevertheless, Grant and Ranson produced a trilogy of Mazeworld tales between 1996 and 1999. Because it is creator-owned, like some other strips to appear in 2000 AD such as Button Man, Grant recalls that the duo "had hopes of selling it for syndication, or perhaps as a computer game." It was licensed in "the US [by] Caliber Comics, which promptly printed the books in black and white, lost much of Arthur's artwork, failed to pay us a bean, then went bust." In the quoted interview, interviewer James Mackay notes that serendipitously Ranson had been recently contacted by "one of the brothers who ran Caliber Comics," who talked to Ranson about returning his Mazeworld artwork.

== Publication history ==
- Mazeworld, #1014-23, 1996
- The Dark Man, #1101-10, 1998
- The Hell Maze, #1151-60, 1999

=== Collected Edition ===
- Mazeworld (2011) Oxford: Rebellion (ISBN 978-1-907992-48-3)
