= Accident Man (comic strip) =

Comic strip series

Accident Man is a series of comic strips written by British comic writers Pat Mills and Tony Skinner and co-created with artist Martin Emond. The stories were initially printed in Toxic! in the early 1990s. A film adaptation was released in 2018, and its sequel in 2022.

== Plot ==
The story centers on the life of Mike Fallon, a high-class hitman. Fallon was known for making his murders look like accidents, often going to extravagant lengths to do so. Fallon is also noted for his love of high living and glamorous girlfriends. Mike Fallon's "I don't give a damn" attitude to his hits was changed the day his ex-girlfriend (a would-be Greenpeace activist) was murdered. Fallon then went on a murderous rampage to find out who paid the contract on his girlfriend and who actually made the hit.

== Bibliography ==
Three Accident Man story series ran in Toxic!, between 6 and 8 issues each.

- Accident Man (by Pat Mills/Tony Skinner)
  - "Accident Man" (with Martin Emond, in Toxic! #1-6, 1991, reprinted in Apocalypse Presents "Accident Man", 1991)
  - "The Death Touch" (with Duke Mighten, in Toxic! #10-16, 1991, Apocalypse Presents "Accident Man Book Two The Death Touch", 1991)
  - "The Messiah Sting" (with John Erusmus, in Toxic! #17-24, 1991)

There was also a three-issue mini series published by Dark Horse comics in 1993, drawn by Duke Mighten this time in black and white.

In March 2014 The Complete Accident Man was published in hardback by Titan Comics (ISBN 978-1782760559).

== Film adaptation ==
In November 2016, a film adaptation went into production in London, directed by Jesse V. Johnson, with a screenplay written by Stu Small and Scott Adkins. Adkins is also cast as Mike Fallon, a high class assassin whose life changes the day his ex-girlfriend is murdered. The film also stars Ashley Greene, Michael Jai White, Ray Park, Ray Stevenson, David Paymer, Nick Moran, Perry Benson, Ross O'Hennessy and Amy Johnston. The film was released in the United States on 6 Feb 2018 and 16 April in the United Kingdom.

In November 2021, a sequel went into production in Malta, directed by Kirby Brothers (George & Harry), with a screenplay written by Stu Small and Scott Adkins.

The sequel was released on 14 October 2022, in the United States and 24 October 2022, in the United Kingdom.
