= Toxic! =

1991 British comic series

Publication information
- Publisher: Apocalypse Ltd
- Schedule: Weekly
- Publication date: March 28 - October 24, 1991
- No. of issues: 31
- Main character(s): Marshal Law; Accident Man; The Bogie Man

Creative team
- Written by: Alan Grant; Pat Mills; John Wagner
- Artist(s): Mike McMahon; Kevin O'Neill
- Editor: Dan Abnett

Toxic! was a British comic that was published weekly from March 28 to October 24, 1991, by Apocalypse Ltd, with a total of 31 issues.

== History ==
Toxic! was the idea of Pat Mills, Kevin O'Neill, Mike McMahon, John Wagner and Alan Grant. The aim was to provide creators an outlet for their work to be published with them retaining the rights and control of their work. This was in contrast to 2000 AD, which Mills had also launched in 1977. Toxic! was to be the main rival of 2000 AD, and would be in full-colour throughout (as opposed to 2000 AD, which was still mainly published in black and white).

Toxic! was published by Apocalypse Ltd, an offshoot of Neptune Distribution based in South Wigston, Leicester. Neptune also owned Trident Comics which printed black and white comics by mainly new, unpublished creators.

The first issue of Toxic! was released in March 1991. Toxic! was initially dominated by Mills (Mills had rejected John Wagner's proposal for Button Man based on its supposed similarity to Accident Man; it later appeared in 2000 AD). His Marshal Law strip was seen as the flagship title and as a character to perhaps rival Judge Dredd. Mills also wrote Accident Man (with Tony Skinner) and Muto-Maniac in the first issue, which was rounded out by a short strip by Alan Grant and Simon Bisley.

This first issue set the tone of Toxic! as it upped the levels of violence, bad language and general anarchic tone that Mills had felt was lacking in 2000 AD at the time. The second issue saw Wagner and Grant's The Bogie Man strip start in an adventure called The Chinese Syndrome. The strip did not fit comfortably with the others and The Chinese Syndrome stopped suddenly with issue nine, and a different story, The Manhattan Project, started with issue eleven. The second issue also saw the launch of The Driver co-written and co-drawn by David Leach and Jeremy Banx, one episode of which resulted in a visit by the local constabulary to the offices of Toxic! after a complaint from an offended reader about Toxic! containing obscene material. Issue #15 saw the start of The Dinner Ladies From Hell written and drawn by David Leach, described as a cross between Dennis Wheatley and Robert Rankin.

This was not the only strip which suffered problems, Marshal Law began to miss issues, and some of the material replacing it proved not to be as popular. Some strips meant to be published by Trident Comics were even used to provide filler material. This hurt the title, as although it had sold well initially, sales were dropping, and it became clear that there were problems with Apocalypse paying creators. These problems meant many creators such as Mike McMahon saw work published which he had not been paid for. After 31 issues, the comic was cancelled and shortly afterward Apocalypse went bankrupt. This meant many involved were never paid and some of those never worked in comics again.

== Legacy ==
Toxic! may have ended up being a failure but it proved a full colour weekly comic could be done. This changed 2000AD as it was forced to change its format to mirror the full colour format of Toxic!. It also gave some creators their first major break into comics, Mike Carey being one of several examples.

Several strips did go off to other publishers. Mills took Marshal Law, Sex Warrior and Accident Man to Dark Horse, Wagner and Grant took The Bogie Man to Atomeka Press, and several other strips were recycled in 2000AD.

In September 2002 Egmont UK launched a boy's magazine entitled Toxic, which has proven to be very popular, but apart from the title, there is no connection with the comic of the nineties. Toxic does contain some comic strips of the juvenile toilet humour variety.

== Notable stories ==
- Marshal Law, these were new adventures of Mills and O'Neill's superhero-hunter, previously published by Marvel Comics' Epic imprint. This was the most consistently popular story but suffered from missing issues and ending abruptly during a storyline. The story was eventually completed and published by Dark Horse.
- Accident Man, an assassin who makes his hits look like accidents, written by Mills and Tony Skinner and drawn initially by Martin Emond, later by Duke Mighten and John Erasmus. This also ended up at Dark Horse and was optioned to be made into a film in 1997. A film was finally made in 2017.
- Muto-Maniac, a science fiction series about a man who attracts bad luck, by Mills and McMahon. This story was uncompleted.
- The Bogie Man, Wagner and Grant's delusional Glaswegian would-be Bogart, drawn by Robin Smith and Cam Kennedy. Both of the stories which ran in Toxic! were completed at Atomeka Press. The Chinese Syndrome was also renamed Chinatoon at Atomeka. A television film version was shown in 1992, starring Robbie Coltrane. A third series ran in the Judge Dredd Megazine.
- Makabre, a religious vigilante of the future, by Alan Grant and Enrique Alcatena. This story was uncompleted.
- Sex Warrior, by Mills, Skinner and Will Simpson, a war in which sexual energy is used as a weapon, satirising the concept that "old people make wars... young people fight them". The story was revamped for a two issue mini series published by Dark Horse.
- Brats Bizarre, a team of decadent superheroes, by Mills, Skinner and Duke Mighten. This story was uncompleted.
- The Driver: A man known only as The Driver drives a five-mile-long truck full of toxic and industrial waste (including wreckage from the Challenger Shuttle disaster) through the middle of middle America only to fly tip it into Meteor Crater, Arizona, in the process he uses a small town as a brake. On the back of the Driver, Banx and Leach were commissioned by Marvel US to write and draw Toxic Crusaders both for the regular title and then for an aborted 4 issue mini series. The Driver himself featured in the following year's comic convention UKCAC logo.
- The Dinner Ladies From Hell by David Leach. In the story, the wives of the Four Riders of the Apocalypse have six days, six hours and six minutes to corrupt seven children with the deadly sins and only one man and God's cook book stand in their way.
- Detritus Rex: Written and drawn by Banx and coloured by Leach, this bizarre and twisted post-ecological-apocalypse tale was uncompleted.

== See also ==
- Crisis, published by Fleetway Publications from 17 September 1988 to October 1991
- Deadline, published by Deadline Publications Ltd. from October 1988 to October/November 1995
- Revolver, published by Fleetway from July 1990 to January 1991
