= Martin Emond =

New Zealand painter and illustrator (1969-2004)

- Born: Martin Emond; 4 June 1969 New Zealand
- Died: 14 March 2004 (aged 34) Los Angeles, California, U.S.
- Area: Artist
- Notable works: White Trash; Lobo; Verotik covers

Martin Emond (4 June 1969 in New Zealand – 14 March 2004 in Los Angeles, California, United States), also known under the pseudonyms "Martin Fuckin Emond", "Martyfuck", "Martywood", "Mickey Martin" and "MFE", was a New Zealand cartoon illustrator and painter.

Emond's work is said to be reminiscent of rock n' roll tattoos and classic sign art, and characterised by darkly sardonic humour.

== Biography ==
Emond found success early in his career illustrating Gordon Rennie's White Trash comic, which led to other high-profile cartoon work including designing album covers for Glenn Danzig. He drew the (extremely violent and bloody) strip "Accident Man" for the short-lived UK comic Toxic! in 1991. Later he created memorable characters such as the irreverent streetkid Switchblade and girl gang the Rolling Red Knuckles.

Many of his illustrations were also produced extensively as screenprints on clothing for the popular New Zealand streetwear label Illicit. The company signed a two-year deal with California-based clothier Cinder Block, through assistance from intellectual property agency Sharpeco, to create fashions based on a variety of Emond characters. An article on the partnership noted, "Cinder Block were especially taken by a character called Switchblade, a street urchin orphan brought up in a town called Tragedy," noting this character would be the first project of the clothing range. Illicit co-founder Steve Hodge remarked, "[Emond] left a huge amount of work behind. It's all catalogued and storylined," with the article going on to state that the range included more than 150 characters. Illicit also planned a collaboration with Oregon-based publisher Dark Horse Comics to create a coffee table book on Emond's work.

Emond committed suicide by hanging in 2004.

Several of his images were used without authorisation in Pink's music video for "U + Ur Hand."

== Bibliography ==
=== Comics ===
Comics work includes:

- Accident Man (with Pat Mills/Tony Skinner, in Toxic! #1-6, March–May 1991)
- The Missionary (with Ian Abbinnett, in Toxic! #28-30, October 1991)
- White Trash (with Gordon Rennie):
  - "King of the Road" (in Blast #7, December 1991)
  - White Trash (4-issue limited series, Atomeka, Tundra Publishing, 1992)
  - "Stage Coach" (in Heavy Metal #142, January 1993)
  - "Sympathy For the Devil" (in Heavy Metal #149, March 1994)
  - "Turtle Gumbo" (in Heavy Metal #152, September 1994)
- "Put a Nightbreed in Your Tank" (with Daniel Chichester, in Epic #2, Atomeka, Marvel Comics, March 1992)
- "Axel Pressbutton: The Movie" (with Pedro Henry, in A1 vol. 2 #3, Epic Comics, June 1992)
- Chopper: "Dead Man's Curve" (with Garth Ennis, in Judge Dredd Megazine vol. 2 #36, September 1993, collected in Chopper: Surf's Up, tpb, 304 pages, February 2011, ISBN 978-1-907519-27-7)
- Lobo (with Alan Grant, DC Comics):
  - Lobocop (one-shot, February 1994)
  - Lobo: In the Chair (one-shot, August 1994)
  - "Workin' on th' Railroad!" (in Lobo Annual 02, 1994)
  - "The Main Man on th' Prairie!" (in Lobo Annual 02, 1994)
  - Lobo/Deadman: The Brave and the Bald (one-shot, February 1995)
  - Lobo: Bounty Hunting for Fun and Profit (one-shot, February 1995)
- Woodstock, 1969-1994 (with Mort Todd/Charles Schneider and various artists, Marvel Music, 1994, ISBN 0-7851-0075-X)

==== Covers ====
- Spectre vol. 3 #25 (DC Comics, January 1995)
- Verotika #4-9 (Verotik, June 1995 - March 1996)
- Satanika #3 (Verotik, July 1995)
- Sunglasses After Dark #1-2, 6 (Verotik, November 1995 - January 1996, November 1996)
- Igrat #1-2 (Verotik, November 1995 - February 1996)
- Satanika vol. 2 #1-2 (Verotik, February 1996)
- Jaguar God #4-5 (Verotik, June–September 1996)
