= Peak Practice =

British television series

- Genre: Drama
- Created by: Lucy Gannon
- Theme music composer: John Altman (1993–1999); Craig Pruess (2000–2002)
- Country of origin: United Kingdom
- Original language: English
- No. of series: 12
- No. of episodes: 152

Production
- Executive producers: Ted Childs (1993–1996); Jonathan Powell (1997–1998); Sharon Bloom (1999–2002)
- Production location: Derbyshire
- Running time: 60 minutes (including commercials)
- Production companies: Central (1993–1999); Carlton (1999–2002)

Original release
- Network: ITV
- Release: 10 May 1993 – 30 January 2002

Peak Practice is a British drama television series about a GP surgery in Cardale – a small fictional town in the Derbyshire Peak District – and the doctors who worked there. It originally starred Kevin Whately as Dr Jack Kerruish, Amanda Burton as Dr Beth Glover and Simon Shepherd as Dr Will Preston, though the roster of doctors would change many times over the course of the series. It ran on ITV from 10 May 1993 to 30 January 2002 and was one of their most successful series at the time. From 29 October 2026, all 12 series of the show will be able to watch on ITVX.

== Synopsis ==
=== Series 1 – 1993 ===
Dr Jack Kerruish returns to the UK after setting up a clinic in Africa. He has dreams of being a country GP and heads to Derbyshire for an interview at the Beeches surgery. The Beeches is run by Dr Beth Glover who took the practice over from her father when he died. Beth's partner at the practice is Dr Will Preston who, at this time, would prefer a day on the golf course to a full day's surgery. After initial tensions and despite Will's concerns, Beth invites Jack to be a partner at the practice. Jack and Beth share an instant chemistry and after several misunderstandings they finally get together towards the end of Series 1. Will on the other hand faces marital problems with his wife Sarah. He is broken when he discovers she has been having an affair with Daniel Acres, a doctor from the rival health centre. Pressure to keep her and their two children, Tony and Julien, in a posh house results in Will committing a fraudulent drugs trial. When his scam is revealed, Sarah threatens to leave him, and in turn Will has a nervous breakdown. Meanwhile, after years of trying for a baby, landlords of the local pub Chloe and James White have a daughter named Sarah-Jane.

=== Series 2 – 1994 ===
Jack and Beth have grown closer during the series break and in the opening episode, Jack asks for Beth's hand in marriage. She turns him down in fear that she hasn't done enough with her life, and although they try to stay together, they later split up. Will and Sarah struggle to make their marriage work and move to a smaller house to help their financial worries. They face further problems when their son Tony is involved in a serious fight at school and also when Sarah continues to attract male attention. Chloe is diagnosed with Hodgkins disease and faces a tough regime of treatment. Mid series, and Jack and Beth both contend with lovers from their past returning to their lives. After a near-death situation, Beth realises she wants to spend her life with Jack and proposes to him. As Jack and Beth marry, Sarah leaves Will and he once again hits rock bottom. Meanwhile, Chloe gets the good news that she is in remission and as the series ends, The Beeches becomes a fundholding practice.

=== Series 3 – 1995 ===
Jack and Beth have been married for a year and face problems when they each encounter personal difficulties. Beth is rocked by the death of her best friend Isabel De Gines, and Jack feels victimised when a family he tried to help make a complaint against him. Beth decides she wants to start a family but Jack gets an offer to continue his work in Africa. Despite Beth's pleas Jack leaves the practice for a few months. Will and Sarah divorce but find it hard to lead separate lives. On several occasions, they almost give into temptation but Will realises they are better off apart. Whilst in Africa, Jack realises how much he has changed and how much he misses Beth. He returns to Cardale and they try for a family. Beth soon falls pregnant but happiness turns to tragedy when she loses the baby. The Beeches take on trainee GP Andrew Attwood (Gary Mavers) and he moves into the pub whilst completing his exams. Andrew makes Will feel unsettled at the Beeches and he decides to take a job in an inner-city practice. Beth too is looking for a change and finds it hard to shake off her miscarriage. After Will decides to stay on at the Beeches, Jack and Beth decide to take a 6-month sabbatical to Africa.

=== Series 4 – 1996 ===
A year on, and Jack and Beth have still not returned from Africa. They tell Will they wish to open a clinic out there and he is left to look after The Beeches. He is also hit by the news that Sarah is remarrying and taking Tony and Julien to live in America. Andrew continues to work at The Beeches and is joined by his wife Kirsty. She tries hard to settle into Cardale life but the pair have their problems and Kirsty returns to Liverpool. Dr Erica Matthews arrives as a locum and is instantly attracted to Will. They share a kiss but he develops a friendship with Dr Kate Webster from a rival practice. Their relationship becomes serious and Will tries his hardest to play Dad to Kate's son Charlie. Andrew struggles to cope without Kirsty and is unaware when a patient falls for him. When he knocks her back, she makes a complaint against him and Andrew turns to Erica for comfort. They spend the night together but Andrew soon regrets it when Kirsty returns to Cardale. He is honest with her and they decide to move back to Liverpool. Chloe and James become foster parents and she continues to remain in remission. At the end of the series, Kate finds out she is pregnant and despite booking in for a termination, she changes her mind and she and Will decide to settle down together. Erica buys an old cottage and lays her roots in Cardale, and realising they have grown apart, Kirsty decides to return to Liverpool without Andrew.

=== Series 5 – 1997 ===
Dr David Shearer arrives in Cardale to help out at the Beeches. He is an old friend of Beth and Will's and covers the absence of Andrew, who went missing after his split with Kirsty. David's wife Clare and their children Emma and Tom join him in Cardale and he quickly settles back into country life. Much to the annoyance of Andrew, who returns looking for another chance from Will and Erica. Kate gives birth to a baby girl named Emily. However, she and Will soon find out that their baby is sick and their worst fears are realised when Emily is diagnosed with Cystic Fibrosis. A clinic in Bristol offers Emily a place on their programme, resulting in Will and Kate leaving Cardale. Before they go, they get married and leave the Beeches in the hands of Andrew, Erica and David. David faces torment when Claire is diagnosed with manic depression, Andrew is rocked when Kirsty arrives with a child that is not his and Andrew and Erica continue to dance around the idea of having a relationship.

=== Series 11 – early 2001 ===
Will's friends ignore his professional advice; Sam invests in a controversial new drug; and Will clashes with ex-wife Kate over an alcoholic patient.

=== Series 12 – late 2001/early 2002 ===
Tom is involved in a climbing accident; new nurse Claire (Eva Pope) wastes little time in making her presence felt at the practice; and a deadly epidemic puts strain on the Beeches.

== List of characters ==
- Dr Jack Kerruish – Kevin Whately (1993–1995)
- Dr Beth Glover – Amanda Burton (1993–1995)
- Dr Will Preston – Simon Shepherd (1993–1997; 2000–2002)
- Dr Andrew Attwood – Gary Mavers (1995–2000)
- Norman Shorthose – Clive Swift (1998)
- Isabel de Gines – Sylvia Syms (1993–1995)
- Kim Beardsmore – Esther Coles (1993–1999)
- Ellie Ndebala – Sharon Hinds (1993–1994)
- Chloe White – Hazel Ellerby (1993–1998)
- James White – Richard Platt (1993–1998)
- Alice North – Margery Mason
- Trevor Sharpe – Shaun Prendergast (guest 1993; regular 1994–1995)
- Leanda Sharpe – Beth Goddard (recurring 1993–1995)
- Sarah Preston – Jacqueline Leonard (recurring 1993–1996)
- Douglas Hart – Maurice Denham (recurring 1993–1994)
- Laura Elliott – Veronica Roberts (1995–1998)
- Erica Matthews – Saskia Wickham (1996–1998)
- Kate Webster/Preston – Shelagh McLeod (1996–1997; 2000–2002)
- Kirsty Attwood – Sukie Smith (recurring 1996, guest 1997)
- Fred Hargrave – Derek Benfield (guest 1996)
- Dr David Shearer – Adrian Lukis (1997–1999)
- Clare Shearer – Yolanda Vazquez (1997) / Fiona Gillies (1998–1999)
- Dawn Rudge – Sarah Parish (guest 1997; 1998–1999)
- Dr Joanna Graham – Haydn Gwynne (1999–2000)
- Dr Martin Henderson – Christian Burgess (recurring 1999)
- Dr Sam Morgan – Joseph Millson (1999–2001)
- Carol Johnson – Deborah Grant (2000–2002)
- Kerri Davidson – Susannah Corbett (2000–2002)
- Dr Tom Deneley – Gray O'Brien (2000–2002)
- Dr Alex Redman – Maggie O'Neill (2000–2002)
- Claire Brightwell – Eva Pope (2001–2002)

== Production ==
It was based in the Derbyshire village of Crich, although certain scenes were filmed at other nearby Derbyshire towns and villages, most notably Fritchley, Matlock, Belper, Duffield and Ashover. In the final series it was filmed in Staffordshire in the village of Longnor.

== Series overview ==
| Series | Episodes | Originally released | |
| Series | Episodes | First released | Last released |
|---|---|---|---|
| 1 | 8 | 10 May 1993 | 28 June 1993 |
| 2 | 13 | 1 March 1994 | 24 May 1994 |
| 3 | 15 | 31 January 1995 | 16 May 1995 |
| 4 | 10 | 27 February 1996 | 30 April 1996 |
| 5 | 14 | 14 January 1997 | 22 April 1997 |
| 6 | 14 | 5 January 1998 | 20 April 1998 |
| 7 | 13 | 5 January 1999 | 6 April 1999 |
| 8 | 13 | 14 September 1999 | 14 December 1999 |
| 9 | 13 | 4 January 2000 | 28 March 2000 |
| 10 | 13 | 5 September 2000 | 19 December 2000 |
| 11 | 13 | 2 January 2001 | 5 April 2001 |
| 12 | 13 | 25 October 2001 | 30 January 2002 |

== Episodes ==
Series 1 (1993)
| No. | Episode title | Synopsis | Air date |
| 1 | "Sharp Practice" | Dr Jack Kerruish starts work at a surgery in Derbyshire, where he develops a volatile relationship with fellow medic Beth Glover. | 10 May 1993 |
| 2 | "Outsiders" | The Beeches finally becomes a paying concern – but Beth's relief at its new-found solvency is cut short by the discovery that a rival health centre is stealing her patients. | 17 May 1993 |
| 3 | "Growing Pains" | Jack treats an athlete whose sudden pre-race injury seems just a little too convenient to be true. | 24 May 1993 |
| 4 | "Roses Around the Door" | Jack tries to help a childless couple and learns a harsh lesson on the realities of country life. | 31 May 1993 |
| 5 | "Impulsive Behaviour" | Jack helps resolve a confused priest's doubts about his mental state, and begins flirting with an attractive trainee GP working at rival centre The Beeches. | 7 June 1993 |
| 6 | "Hope to Die" | Jack and Beth disagree over the treatment of a young patient with a heart defect, while Sarah and Will's marriage deteriorates as their financial problems mount. | 14 June 1993 |
| 7 | "Listening Skills" | Will desperately tries to make up with Sarah and comes up with a plan to clear their debts. | 21 June 1993 |
| 8 | "Giddy Heights" | Jack's mountain rescue skills are put to the test when a kidney transplant patient is lost during a storm, while Will tries to deal with his personal problems. | 28 June 1993 |
Series 2 (1994)
| No. | Episode title | Synopsis | Air date |
| 1 | "In Good Faith" | Jack struggles to save an asthmatic girl's life when her mother will only resort to faith healing. Meanwhile, Will has survived his breakdown and is eager to go back to work. | 1 March 1994 |
| 2 | "Old Habits" | The three doctors fall out when a consultant refuses to operate on their heart patient because he is a heavy smoker. Meanwhile, Will's marriage suffers another setback. | 8 March 1994 |
| 3 | "Love Thy Neighbour" | Jack is caught in a dilemma when he has to tell his best friends that Chloe has cancer, and his relationship with Beth continues to deteriorate. | 15 March 1994 |
| 4 | "Act of Remembrance" | Jack has to deal with a patient whose employer will not let her rest. Meanwhile, Isabel and Ken's romance takes a dive when their ward collapses. | 22 March 1994 |
| 5 | "Enemy Within" | Jack is shocked and angry when Beth is assaulted by a patient's father. | 30 March 1994 |
| 6 | "Long Weekend" | Jack tries to help his ex-fiancée Karen, who is an acute schizophrenic, while Kim contracts a rare infection. | 6 April 1994 |
| 7 | "Chance Encounter" | After secretly meeting her ex-lover, Beth comes across an accident on the moors which takes a life-threatening turn. | 13 April 1994 |
| 8 | "Life Changes" | Will's marriage hits rock bottom and Beth must pass on devastating news to a friend. | 19 April 1994 |
| 9 | "Brave Face" | An old friend of Will's requests his help to end their life. | 26 April 1994 |
| 10 | "Abbey" | The village is shocked when a dead baby is discovered on the moors and a homeless teenage girl is suspected of being the mother. | 3 May 1994 |
| 11 | "Perfect Love" | Beth and Jack are excited about their wedding day, but their friends' idyllic marriage reveals deeper feelings which bring them down to earth. | 10 May 1994 |
| 12 | "Power Games" | Jack suspects a patient of malingering and Beth becomes embroiled in a family dispute when one of her patients suffers a heart attack. | 17 May 1994 |
| 13 | "Happy Ever After" | Alice appears in court for non-payment of council tax, a teenager asks Jack for tranquillisers, and interviews are held for the post of fund manager. | 24 May 1994 |
Series 3 (1995)
| No. | Episode title | Synopsis | Air date |
| 1 | "Light at the End of the Tunnel" | A group of school kids get trapped in a mine forcing Jack to face his fears as he tries to rescue them. Meanwhile, Sarah and Will finally decide to divorce. | 31 January 1995 |
| 2 | "Tender" | A new nurse joins the practice and Will stands as a candidate for the local council. Meanwhile, Beth comes to terms with her friend's imminent death. | 7 February 1995 |
| 3 | "Coming Out" | Beth treats two youngsters for an infection spread by rat urine, while Jack opposes Cardale residents trying to get a new home for ex-psychiatric patients closed down. | 14 February 1995 |
| 4 | "Losing Out" | Beth finds herself in the unhappy position of having to investigate her own husband's professional conduct, a predicament made worse by the grief of Isabel's funeral. | 28 February 1995 |
| 5 | "To Have and to Hold" | Jack feels increasingly disillusioned with life in Cardale and goes to set up a new clinic in Africa, leaving Beth hard-pressed to cope in his absence. | 7 March 1995 |
| 6 | "Fighting Chance" | Will tries to help a boxing champion whose blackouts are casting a shadow over his future in sport, but only succeeds in driving him into the bare-knuckle arena. | 14 March 1995 |
| 7 | "Family Ties" | Will's son is seriously injured on the school rugby field, while Jack returns from Africa and barely has chance to unpack before he is called out to an attempted death. | 21 March 1995 |
| 8 | "Ill Wind" | A freak storm hits Cardale, and the Kerruishes work round the clock to treat casualties, saving strangers as well as close friends injured in the devastation. | 28 March 1995 |
| 9 | "A Normal Life" | A Cardale schoolgirl begins behaving erratically, causing concern for her parents and provoking a professional difference of opinion between Will and Beth. | 4 April 1995 |
| 10 | "Walking Away" | New trainee Andrew Attwood arrives at The Beeches and causes friction, falling foul of Jack and losing a valuable contract. | 11 April 1995 |
| 11 | "Bedside Manners" | Andrew lands himself in hot water again by failing to diagnose a patient's life-threatening condition, while Jack doubts Will's commitment to the practice. | 18 April 1995 |
| 12 | "Giving Up" | Pub tenants James and Chloe ask Jack for advice on how to become foster parents, and Beth is rushed to hospital with abdominal pains, leaving Andrew to handle her workload. | 25 April 1995 |
| 13 | "Nobody's Fault" | Andrew tries to help a distressed patient who is mutilating himself, but when the man attempts suicide the doctor realises the situation is more severe than he thought. | 2 May 1995 |
| 14 | "Life and Soul" | Jack considers expanding the practice, though Will voices his objections, while Beth links a patient's ill health to his working environment. | 9 May 1995 |
| 15 | "Other Lives" | Beth wants to move away from Cardale, but Jack doesn't share her enthusiasm. Meanwhile, Chloe and James White attend an interview at the fostering agency. | 16 May 1995 |
Series 4 (1996)
| No. | Episode title | Synopsis | Air date |
| 1 | "Holding It Together" | Now that Jack and Beth have left for Africa, Will sets about finding new partners to help run The Beeches, a task made doubly difficult by new locum Erica Matthews. | 27 February 1996 |
| 2 | "A New Life" | Will bids a tearful farewell to the boys as they leave for Florida, while Erica is confronted by a patient suffering from delusions. | 5 March 1996 |
| 3 | "New Horizons" | Erica throws a house-warming party, intending to use it as an excuse to chat up Will – but he spoils her plans by turning up with a doctor from the nearby health centre. | 12 March 1996 |
| 4 | "Looking Back" | Erica clashes with Will as she struggles to deal with the emotional problems created by the arrival of old flame Dan Copeland, who has tracked her down from Manchester. | 19 March 1996 |
| 5 | "Whipping Boy" | Will and Andrew clash over the welfare of a boy trapped in a bitter custody battle, while locum doctor Erica is angry to learn her position has been advertised. | 26 March 1996 |
| 6 | "Close Ties" | Erica intervenes in an operation, saving the patient's life and prompting Will to look favourably on her application. Kirsty begins to have doubts about her future with Andrew. | 2 April 1996 |
| 7 | "In Safe Hands" | Andrew secures a patient's life-saving operation, but Kirsty is still left wondering if she's doing the right thing. | 9 April 1996 |
| 8 | "Partners" | Will finds himself increasingly drawn to Kate – until a disagreement prompted by a multiple sclerosis sufferer's violent husband makes him have second thoughts. | 16 April 1996 |
| 9 | "Running on Empty" | Personal dilemmas continue to overshadow the medical agenda, as a depressed Andrew jeopardises his career and Kate agonises over Will's suggestion they move in together. | 23 April 1996 |
| 10 | "Heart and Soul" | Kate announces she's pregnant but intends to have an abortion, forcing Will to make an agonising personal choice. | 30 April 1996 |
Series 5 (1997)
| No. | Episode title | Synopsis | Air date |
| 1 | "Eye of the Storm" | Will is ecstatic to become a father and Andrew returns to Cardale after six months away, asking for his old job back, but finds a surprise in store for him. | 14 January 1997 |
| 2 | "The Price" | Will and Kate face a harrowing time as their baby's health deteriorates alarmingly. | 21 January 1997 |
| 3 | "Innocent Blood" | David's family join him in Cardale, but his happiness is marred by the discovery that a boy he helped deliver 11 years ago has contracted a deadly illness. | 28 January 1997 |
| 4 | "Letting Go" | Will says farewell to his friends and colleagues over a special lunch which ends in a big surprise for the departing doctor, while Erica battles to save Alice North's life. | 4 February 1997 |
| 5 | "Classics" | Andrew is seriously injured in a car crash en route to Erica's birthday party, and faces the grim task of ensuring his fellow motorists make it through the night alive. | 11 February 1997 |
| 6 | "Lost Feelings" | David helps a paraplegic friend and his wife fulfil their dearest wish to have a child, while Andrew investigates Erica's claims of supernatural goings-on. | 18 February 1997 |
| 7 | "Home Truths" | Andrew and Erica clash over the best way to treat a baby's mysterious illness. | 4 March 1997 |
| 8 | "Running to Hide" | Andrew's relationship with his shapely accountant goes beyond business, while David worries about his wife's erratic behaviour and the practice is sued for negligence. | 11 March 1997 |
| 9 | "Borrowed Time" | An old friend of Andrew arrives in Cardale with devastating news. | 18 March 1997 |
| 10 | "Tough Love" | Andrew bites the bullet and tells Erica he wants them to be a couple, but her reaction is not as he had hoped. Claire's extrovert behaviour causes gossip among the locals. | 25 March 1997 |
| 11 | "State of Mind" | Clare unwittingly endangers an older patient's life, forcing David to step back and take a long, hard look at what's causing her erratic behaviour. | 1 April 1997 |
| 12 | "Priorities" | Erica's commitment to the Beeches is tested to the limit. | 8 April 1997 |
| 13 | "A Change of Heart" | Andrew's ex-wife turns up out of the blue, forcing him to re-examine his feelings for her and Erica, while Clare's mental condition takes yet another turn for the worse. | 15 April 1997 |
| 14 | "Fight or Flight" | David treats a pilot suffering from what seems to be vertigo, although his dizzy spells could have another cause. | 22 April 1997 |
Series 6 (1998)
| No. | Episode title | Synopsis | Air date |
| 1 | "All Fall Down" | David and Andrew strive to convince the authorities that mass inoculation is the only way to prevent a meningitis outbreak sweeping through Cardale. | 5 January 1998 |
| 2 | "Through a Glass Darkly" | Erica is left traumatised by a meeting with her natural father, while Andrew regrets inviting David to go house-hunting with him. | 12 January 1998 |
| 3 | "A Matter of Principle" | David takes on the local health authority, outraged that they won't operate on a Down's syndrome heart patient. | 19 January 1998 |
| 4 | "The Good Son" | A local lad returns to Cardale after travelling the world, but it soon becomes clear he's got something to hide. A phone call from his sister shatters Andrew's happiness. | 26 January 1998 |
| 5 | "Another Day of Life" | New locum Nick Goodson arrives at the Beeches and Erica's role as prosecution witness in a controversial child abuse trial makes her the target of a hate campaign. | 2 February 1998 |
| 6 | "A Change of View" | Erica prepares to visit Andrew in Liverpool, leaving locum Nick Goodson in charge of the surgery, while David tangles with a pair of runaway pensioners in a stolen coach. | 9 February 1998 |
| 7 | "Body and Soul" | Andrew stops dithering and proposes to Erica, but his mind is soon distracted from romance by the plight of a priest suffering from a mystery illness. | 16 February 1998 |
| 8 | "The Spinning Wheel" | Andrew's terminally ill mother asks him to help end her life, while back in Cardale, the past catches up with scheming locum Dr Nick Goodson in spectacular fashion. | 23 February 1998 |
| 9 | "Glass Houses" | David has an unscheduled run-in with old flame Anna Bradshaw, and it isn't long before sparks are flying in more ways than one. | 2 March 1998 |
| 10 | "The Ghost in the Machine" | Erica makes a decision over Andrew's proposal, but while looking to the future, a dangerous legacy from the past threatens public safety elsewhere in Cardale. | 16 March 1998 |
| 11 | "The Falling Sky" | A woman holds a wounded Andrew and a heavily pregnant Clare at gunpoint, triggering a tense siege. | 23 March 1998 |
| 12 | "A Child I Dreamed" | A woman who agrees to be a surrogate mother finds her decision has far-reaching consequences. | 30 March 1998 |
| 13 | "Two Things Stand Like Stone" | Erica prepares for her hen night, Rob McBride's past threatens to ruin his future. | 6 April 1998 |
| 14 | "Once in a Lifetime" | Cardale prepares for Andrew and Erica's wedding, but a health scare tests everyone to the limit. | 20 April 1998 |
Series 7 (1999)
| No. | Episode title | Synopsis | Air date |
| 1 | "Race Against Time" | Andrew takes up rally driving in the hope it will help him forget Erica. | 5 January 1999 |
| 2 | "The Ties That Bind" | The race is on to find a suitable donor to save a dying leukaemia patient. | 12 January 1999 |
| 3 | "Turn a Blind Eye" | Joanna feels the emotional strain of general practice when one of her patients faces death. | 19 January 1999 |
| 4 | "Comrades in Arms" | Andrew's judgement is put on the line in a battle of prejudice and personal feeling. | 26 January 1999 |
| 5 | "Passion" | David gives an old friend some shocking advice, but struggles to practise what he preaches. | 2 February 1999 |
| 6 | "Map of the Heart: Part 1" | David tries to help a troubled teenager, but ends up risking the happiness of everyone around him. | 9 February 1999 |
| 7 | "Map of the Heart: Part 2" | As Cardale struggles to come to terms with David's shocking death, a destructive patient pushes Andrew's patience to the limit. | 23 February 1999 |
| 8 | "Before the Lights Go Out" | A new face appears at the Beeches, and Joanna's heroic efforts to arrange an operation for an Alzheimer's sufferer bring her into contact with an old flame. | 2 March 1999 |
| 9 | "Fighting Chance" | The staff fight to save the community hospital, finding an ally in Ronnie, who uses his experience to their advantage. | 9 March 1999 |
| 10 | "No Bounds" | Sam is tormented by the case of a cancer sufferer who refuses to endanger her unborn child by undergoing treatment, while the campaign to save the local hospital gets a boost. | 16 March 1999 |
| 11 | "Take Her Back" | Joanna is held at knifepoint by a runaway mother, some good news lifts Sam's depression over the death of a patient and romance blossoms between Andrew and Dawn. | 23 March 1999 |
| 12 | "Single Minded" | Dawn fears her breast cancer might return, while plucky local copper Pete Greenhalgh faces an adversary even his courage cannot protect him from. | 30 March 1999 |
| 13 | "The Nature of Things" | Clare Shearer returns to Cardale and wastes no time in claiming her share of the Beeches. | 6 April 1999 |
Series 8 (1999)
| No. | Episode title | Synopsis | Air date |
| 1 | "Breaking Point" | A chance encounter with a troop of soldiers plunges Joanna and Andrew into a life-or-death crisis. | 14 September 1999 |
| 2 | "Alone" | A savage attack on Alice North shocks Cardale, and helps push Joanna back into the arms of her ex-lover Martin Henderson. | 21 September 1999 |
| 3 | "Eskimo Roll" | Sam learns a respected member of the community is harbouring a devastating secret and Joanna grows concerned about Alice's state of mind. | 28 September 1999 |
| 4 | "Wood for the Trees" | Dawn's son slips into a coma, leaving surgeons baffled Meanwhile, estranged father Keith turns up, indicating his disapproval of his wife's involvement with Andrew. | 5 October 1999 |
| 5 | "Buying Time" | Sam breaks all the rules and gets emotionally involved with a patient, casting a shadow over his future at the Beeches. | 12 October 1999 |
| 6 | "Change of Life" | Sam makes an unusual bet with a smoker anxious to quit, while Andrew tries to help a farmer whose failing health has driven him to take desperate measures. | 19 October 1999 |
| 7 | "Close to Heaven: Part 1" | Tragedy looms as Andrew and Sam try to save an injured man from a fast-flowing river, only too aware that his life rests in their hands. | 2 November 1999 |
| 8 | "Close to Heaven: Part 2" | Sam is tormented by the thought that he could have done more to help Andrew and Joanna's teenage patient recoils from the prospect of an operation. | 9 November 1999 |
| 9 | "The First Stone" | Sam tries to help an overweight local woman whose efforts to slim are placing her life in jeopardy, while Joanna sparks off another health scare in Cardale. | 16 November 1999 |
| 10 | "Hearts and Minds" | Joanna is presented with an unenviable dilemma by old flame Martin Henderson, who asks her to leave Cardale and start a new life with him. | 23 November 1999 |
| 11 | "Not Waving But Drowning" | Sam is visited by an old friend who seems to have gone up in the world since their schooldays together, but the reunion has a tragic outcome. | 30 November 1999 |
| 12 | "Moving On" | Andrew tries to convince his friend Ronnie Neale that he has a serious illness, and ends up coming to blows with Dawn's estranged husband Keith over her affections. | 7 December 1999 |
| 13 | "New Beginnings" | Joanna breaks devastating news to a teenage gymnast, and finds herself thrust into the middle of a family crisis. | 14 December 1999 |
Series 9 (2000)
| No. | Episode title | Synopsis | Air date |
| 1 | "And Then There Were Two" | The sickly folk of Cardale are hit by another mystery illness, which sweeps through the village spreading terror in its wake. | 4 January 2000 |
| 2 | "Close to Home" | Kerri Davidson starts work at the Beeches, while Andrew intervenes to solve Sam's accommodation dilemma. | 11 January 2000 |
| 3 | "Family Values" | Andrew treats a man whose sister is killing him with kindness, while Sam encourages a grieving husband to accept responsibility for his baby daughter. | 18 January 2000 |
| 4 | "Letting Go" | The doctors wrestle with the concept of assisted death. | 25 January 2000 |
| 5 | "Language of the Eye" | A hypochondriac tries Joanna's patience with a string of fictitious illnesses, while Andrew attempts to help a girl's parents come to terms with her deafness. | 1 February 2000 |
| 6 | "Once Too Often" | Joanna faces dilemmas on both a personal and professional level, while Sam sets his heart on a romantic goal and Andrew tries to avoid appearing deceitful. | 8 February 2000 |
| 7 | "Truth or Dare" | A chemical spillage outside the Black Swan plunges Cardale into a state of emergency, and it's up to Andrew and Sam to save lives. | 15 February 2000 |
| 8 | "Ghosts" | Sam tries to reunite a family torn apart by a terrible secret, while Joanna sets off to see Tom in Scarborough – but has trouble telling him the reason for her visit. | 22 February 2000 |
| 9 | "A Test of Faith" | Andrew and Kate help an alcoholic woman fighting to keep custody of her children, while Mike and Liz digest some unexpected news. | 29 February 2000 |
| 10 | "Turning Tides" | Carol's troubled son turns up unexpectedly, Sam and Kerri expose a drugs fraud, and Andrew makes a life-changing decision. | 7 March 2000 |
| 11 | "Faith, Hope & Love" | Sam is forced to confront his feelings for Kerri, while Joanna discovers a patient's seemingly trivial snoring problem hides a sensitive issue. | 14 March 2000 |
| 12 | "Last Orders" | Joanna and Tom face tough decisions about their future, and Sam's medical bag is stolen, leading to a crisis for one of his patients. | 21 March 2000 |
| 13 | "Hopes and Dreams" | A feud between a local farmer and a fairground family has tragic consequences for Joanna, while Andrew learns his affair with Kate is no longer a secret. | 28 March 2000 |
Series 10 (2000)
| No. | Episode title | Synopsis | Air date |
| 1 | "For Love of the Child" | A fresh face joins the surgery, while a patient suspected of being a paedophile is the cause of a fierce dispute between Tom and Andrew. | 5 September 2000 |
| 2 | "Hit and Run" | Alex tries to get to the bottom of a local policeman's aggressive behaviour and finds his dark secret, while Richard edges nearer to finding out the truth about Kate's affair. | 12 September 2000 |
| 3 | "Skin Deep" | Andrew feels the wrath of Richard as his affair with Kate becomes common knowledge. Tom struggles to help a teenager whose battle against anorexia is tearing her family apart. | 19 September 2000 |
| 4 | "On a Clear Day" | A childless woman's bid to adopt is thrown into jeopardy by ill health, and Tom seeks a nanny to look after Joe. | 26 September 2000 |
| 5 | "Absolution" | Andrew and Kate's relationship sails into stormy waters as Richard's life hangs in the balance, and Alex tries to persuade a patient to undergo treatment for his breast cancer. | 3 October 2000 |
| 6 | "Lonely Hearts: Part 1" | Andrew gains a doting fan, and Carol discovers her new male friend has an unorthodox method of pain relief. | 31 October 2000 |
| 7 | "Lonely Hearts: Part 2" | Andrew's career hangs in the balance as the GMC hearing deliberates over charges of misconduct with an infatuated former patient. | 7 November 2000 |
| 8 | "Divided We Stand" | Will fears a patient is pressuring his younger brother into donating a kidney, while Alice makes a shocking discovery about the local TV repair man. | 14 November 2000 |
| 9 | "Keeping Up the Act" | Sam helps a lovestruck teenager deal with an embarrassing complaint, and pub landlord Mike Pullen pushes himself too far to impress the brewery manager. | 21 November 2000 |
| 10 | "Playing God" | A pregnant woman's dilemma reminds Will of a past tragedy, and Alex is forced to tackle her addiction while treating a victim of passive smoking. | 28 November 2000 |
| 11 | "Walls of Jericho" | Alex has to summon up the courage of her convictions to help a patient with Down's syndrome, and Will comes to the aid of a feuding couple. | 5 December 2000 |
| 12 | "Masquerade" | Will makes the mistake of getting emotionally attached to a patient with psychiatric problems, and a black cloud descends over Kerri and Sam's engagement party. | 12 December 2000 |
| 13 | "Electricity" | The Beeches partnership is suddenly thrown into a state of turmoil as fate deals a cruel blow to Sam and Kerri, leaving them fighting for their lives. | 19 December 2000 |
Series 11 (2001)
| No. | Episode title | Synopsis | Air date |
| 1 | "Still Waters" | Will's sympathy for a couple of old friends contemplating fertility treatment soon turns to irritation when they opt to take matters into their own hands. | 2 January 2001 |
| 2 | "Flesh and Blood" | Tom blows his top when Bridgit breaks the rules by having an affair with a haemophiliac patient, and Sam invests in a controversial new drug. | 9 January 2001 |
| 3 | "Win Some, Lose Some" | Tom fears cyclist Nick Pullen is being pushed beyond his limits by an overzealous trainer, while Will clashes with ex-wife Kate over an alcoholic patient. | 16 January 2001 |
| 4 | "Trust in Me" | Will uncovers the extent of Sam's deception as he prepares to go down the aisle with Kerri, leaving the bride with a tough decision to make. | 23 January 2001 |
| 5 | "Together We Stand" | Alex helps two elderly sisters against Will's orders and discovers something about herself into the bargain, while Tom persuades Kerri to face everyone at work. | 30 January 2001 |
| 6 | "Prisoners of the Past" | Will treats a nun with a broken arm and in the process finds she's dying from an incurable illness, a traumatic revelation that brings him closer to wife Kate. | 6 February 2001 |
| 7 | "Private Lives, Public Eye" | The Mayor of Cardale suffers severe attacks of lethargy, and Tom uncovers an affair between a local teacher and her pupil. | 13 February 2001 |
| 8 | "Suffer the Little Children" | Will unwittingly brings to light a family scandal, while Tom and Alex's budding relationship is jeopardised by a difference of medical opinion. | 20 February 2001 |
| 9 | "Body Beautiful" | Tom helps a swimming instructor come to terms with a serious bowel condition, and a meals-on-wheels driver suffers a stroke at the wheel and nearly crashes into Kate. | 8 March 2001 |
| 10 | "Hidden Agendas" | Alex struggles to save a boy's life after a farmer dumps dangerous chemicals in a pond, but is distracted when her estranged father turns up seeking a reconciliation. | 15 March 2001 |
| 11 | "Crossfire" | Will's career is thrown into turmoil when one of his patients has an epileptic fit while driving and is killed in the ensuing crash. | 22 March 2001 |
| 12 | "Blind Spot" | Tom is caught in a dilemma when a harassed mother requests an abortion without telling her husband. Alex faces her cancer test ordeal alone. | 29 March 2001 |
| 13 | "Bad Medicine" | Alex flees the practice and heads back home to York, hotly pursued by Tom, who tries to persuade her to face up to her illness. | 5 April 2001 |
Series 12 (2001–2002)
| No. | Episode title | Synopsis | Air date |
| 1 | "Conduct Unbecoming" | Sultry nurse Claire Brightwell breezes into Cardale to shake up the practice, while Tom is involved in a climbing accident and Will's son Tony returns. | 25 October 2001 |
| 2 | "Bad Tony" | Newcomer Claire wastes little time in making her presence felt at the practice and tries to seduce Tom, while Will wonders how many more revelations about his son he can take. | 1 November 2001 |
| 3 | "Outsiders 2" | The outbreak of a deadly epidemic puts strain on the practice, while Claire does her wicked best to drive a wedge between Alex and Tom. | 8 November 2001 |
| 4 | "Unhappy Will/Claire's Revenge" | Claire is accused of stealing from a patient, and finds support from her colleagues in short supply, while a modern-day Noah gives Will cause for concern. | 15 November 2001 |
| 5 | "Relationship Hounds" | Dashing new trainee doctor Matt Kendal has a baptism of fire on his first day at the Beeches, while Will's decision to turn away all non-urgent cases has disastrous consequences. | 22 November 2001 |
| 6 | "Unpleasant Reminders" | A weekend away turns into chaos when an Army helicopter crashes, unearthing horrifying memories of the Balkan conflict for Alex and Claire, who race to save the casualties. | 29 November 2001 |
| 7 | "Assault" | Leanne is raped and left for dead, a trauma that sends the whole community into shock. Will apologises to Carol, while Matt and Shaun step up their rivalry on the football field. | 6 December 2001 |
| 8 | "Bald Retribution" | Tom takes the law into his own hands to nail the man who assaulted Leanne, while Kate grows increasingly frustrated by Will's mood swings. | 13 December 2001 |
| 9 | "Betrayal" | A runaway bride causes concern, while Claire's increasingly erratic behaviour worries Alex, and Kate starts spending more and more time with James. | 3 January 2002 |
| 10 | "Bad Practice" | Claire provides a much-needed shoulder to cry on for Will, who is public enemy number one following the emergence of his plans to dissolve the Beeches partnership. | 10 January 2002 |
| 11 | "Accused" | Claire's true colours shine through as she accuses Will of rape, and Alex oversees the exhumation of a marine she believes was murdered by her mentally unstable colleague. | 17 January 2002 |
| 12 | "Gold" | Claire's disappearance has disturbing repercussions, while Will deals with a depressed gardener, and Shaun takes desperate measures to make himself more appealing to Kerri. | 24 January 2002 |
| 13 | "United We Fall" | Tom and Alex's wedding plans have to be put on hold as a cable car emergency demands their attention, and to make matters worse Claire turns up. | 30 January 2002 |

== DVD release ==
Series 1–7 have been released on DVD. In Australia, Series 8 – 12 was released on 19 June 2024 by Via Vision Entertainment.

| DVD title | Discs | Episodes | Release date Region 2 (UK) | Release date Region 4 (Australia) |
|---|---|---|---|---|
| The Complete First Series | 2 | 8 | June 30, 2003 | July 9, 2014 |
| The Complete Second Series | 4 | 13 | May 17, 2004 | July 9, 2014 |
| The Complete Third Series | 4 | 15 | March 3, 2008 | October 8, 2014 |
| The Complete Fourth Series | 3 | 10 | June 16, 2008 | October 8, 2014 |
| The Complete Fifth Series | 4 | 14 | July 13, 2009 | March 11, 2015 |
| The Complete Sixth Series | 4 | 14 | March 29, 2010 | March 11, 2015 |
| The Complete Seventh Series | 4 | 13 | September 7, 2015 | May 6, 2015 |
| The Complete Series 1-7 | 25 | 87 | April 29, 2019 | N/A |
| Series 8-12 | 20 | 65 | N/A | 19 June 2024 |
