= Our Father (2015 film) =

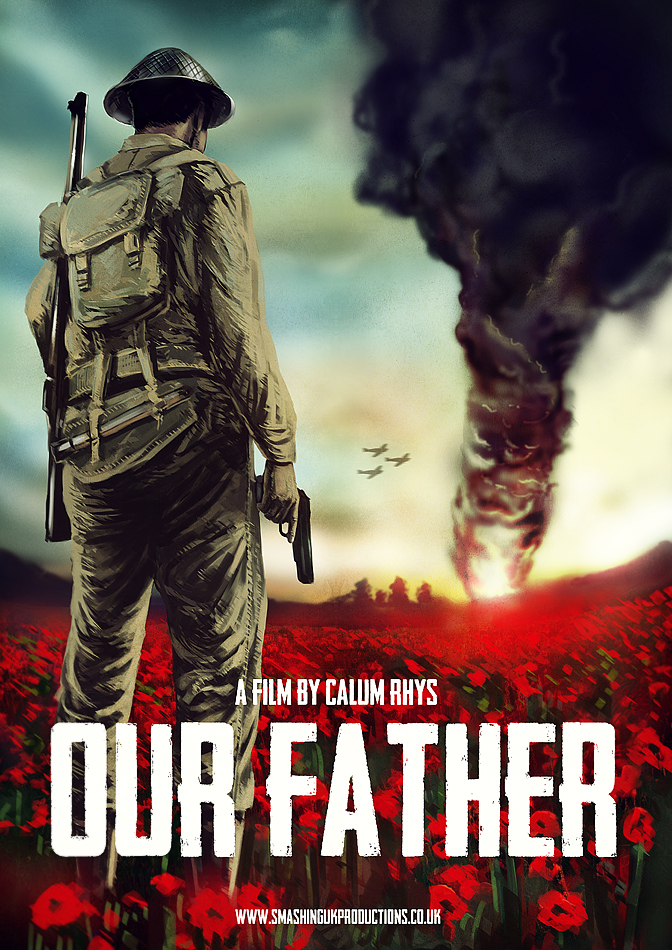
- Film poster
- Directed by: Calum Rhys
- Written by: Calum Rhys
- Produced by: Ryan Eden; Calum Rhys; Morgan Rhys
- Starring: Luke Goddard; Ross O'Hennessy; Aaron Jeffcoate; Jonas Daniel Alexander; Mark Anthony Games; Willem Ward
- Cinematography: Antony Meadley
- Edited by: Calum Rhys
- Music by: Zachary Start
- Production company: Smashing UK Productions
- Release dates: 25 December 2015 (United Kingdom); 20 May 2016 (Cannes)
- Running time: 15 minutes
- Country: United Kingdom
- Languages: English; German
- Budget: £2,500

Our Father is a 2015 British short war drama film written and directed by Calum Rhys. The film stars Luke Goddard, Ross O'Hennessy, Aaron Jeffcoate, Jonas Daniel Alexander and Mark Anthony Games. The film follows a detached British Army section in France during World War II. The film premiered at the 69th Cannes Film Festival.

== Cast ==
- Luke Goddard as Private Cole (born Yorkshire, England in 1920)
- Ross O'Hennessy as Sergeant Browning (born Monmouthshire, Wales in 1904, residing in East Grinstead, England)
- Aaron Jeffcoate as Private Elder (born Glasgow, Scotland in 1925)
- Jonas Daniel Alexander as Corporal Mason (born London, England in 1915)
- Mark Anthony Games as Private Doyle (born Sussex, England in 1918)
- Willem Ward as Young Cole
- Shawn Booker as Wehrmacht Soldier
- Bruce Parkin as Wehrmacht Soldier
- Ryan Eden as Wehrmacht Soldier
- Morgan Rhys as Wehrmacht Soldier
- Michael Smith as British Soldier

== Production ==
The film was financed through crowdfunding, with the majority of funding provided by benefactors in the United Kingdom. Further financial support was contributed by backers in Italy, South Korea, Spain and the United States.

Rehearsals began in late July 2014 in Worcester, England followed by principal photography on 9 August 2014 in Worcestershire, with cinematographer Antony Meadley using a Red Epic camera to shoot the entire film. Filming continued for five days at locations including Bromsgrove, Worcester, Malvern and Pershore, with further additional photography in the United States at Wallops Island, Virginia.

== Reception ==
=== Critical response ===
The film received positive reviews from critics and festivals. Oaxaca FilmFest described Our Father as "a film that moves with goosebump-raising sensitivity; beautifully shot and well produced". The Independent Critic's Richard Propes wrote that the film is "a journey that maintains semblance of human connection and a humane existence." Bucharest ShortCut CineFest called Our Father "a beautiful poetic approach."

=== Accolades ===
| Award / Film Festival | Date of ceremony | Category | Recipient(s) | Result | Reference(s) |
|---|---|---|---|---|---|
| Rhode Island International Film Festival | 9 August 2016 | Best Short Film | Our Father | Semi-finalist | |
| Portsmouth International Film Festival | 25 September 2016 | Best British Film | Our Father | Nominated | |
| Portsmouth International Film Festival | 25 September 2016 | Best Costume Design | Craig Leonard | Won | |
| Sydney Indie Film Festival | 20 October 2016 | Best Film | Our Father | Nominated | |
| Sydney Indie Film Festival | 20 October 2016 | Best Male Lead | Luke Goddard | Won | |
| Sydney Indie Film Festival | 20 October 2016 | Best Cinematography | Antony Meadley | Nominated | |
| Sydney Indie Film Festival | 20 October 2016 | Best Editing | Calum Rhys | Nominated | |
| Sydney Indie Film Festival | 20 October 2016 | Best Drama | Our Father | Nominated | |
| Sydney Indie Film Festival | 20 October 2016 | Best Production Design | Our Father | Nominated | |
| Sydney Indie Film Festival | 20 October 2016 | Best Special Effects | Our Father | Nominated | |
| Midlands Movies Film Awards | 26 February 2017 | Best Cinematography | Antony Meadley | Nominated | |
| Midlands Movies Film Awards | 26 February 2017 | Best Original Score | Zachary Start | Won | |
| Midlands Movies Film Awards | 26 February 2017 | Best Production Design | Our Father | Nominated | |
| Normandie World War II International Film Festival | 5 June 2017 | Outstanding World War II Short Film | Our Father | Nominated | |
