= Gary Mavers =

English actor

- Born: Gary John Mavers; 1 September 1964 (age 61); Huyton, Lancashire, England
- Occupation: Actor
- Years active: 1988–present
- Notable work: Peak Practice; Casualty; Emmerdale
- Children: Abby Mavers (daughter)
- Relatives: Lee Mavers (brother)

Gary John Mavers (born 1 September 1964) is an English television actor.

Mavers graduated from the Royal Academy of Dramatic Art, and is best known for the roles of GP Andrew Attwood in Peak Practice which he worked on for 5 years as a doctor in a country practice, (1995 – 2000), and Will Manning in Casualty in a year long role, (2004 – 2005).

Mavers took over the role of Gordon Livesy in Emmerdale from 2015 to 2016 where his character was involved in a child abuse storyline, after it was revealed Gordon abused his son Aaron Livesy (played by Danny Miller) as a child. Mavers was said to have "the hardest job on TV" by many and was congratulated for both his sinister portrayal of the character and being willing to take on the controversial role.

Mavers has three daughters, including actress Abby Mavers, and is also the younger brother of The La's frontman Lee Mavers and older brother of The La's drummer Neil Mavers.

Mavers also has an online YouTube channel called "Classic Obsession - Gary Mavers" in which he restores classic cars.

== Filmography ==
Year	Title	Role	Notes
1989	Resurrected	Johnny Fodden	TV film
1990	Screen Two	Gordon Parry	Episode: "The Man from the Pru"
1990	Screenplay	John	Episode: "Needle"
1990	Boon	Shane	Episode: "Rival Eyes"
1990	The Ruth Rendell Mysteries	Colin Budd	Episode: "An Unkindness of Ravens (Parts 1 & 2)"
1991	G.B.H.	Billy Thug	TV miniseries
1991	Chimera	Forester	TV miniseries
1991	Blonde Fist	Tony Bone	
1993	Screen Two	Harry	Episode: "Maria's Child"
1993	Body & Soul	Hal	TV miniseries
1993	Fighting for Gemma	Stephen D'Arcy	TV film
1995–2000	Peak Practice	Dr. Andrew Attwood	Main cast
1998	The Unknown Soldier	Angel	TV miniseries
2000	Blue Murder	DS Adam Ross	TV film
2004	Where the Heart Is	Greg Cudby	Episode: "The Games We Play"
2004–2005	Casualty	DI Will Manning	Main cast
2006	Dead Man's Cards	Bob	
2011	Justice	Joe Gateacre	TV miniseries
2011	Doctors	John Manners	Episode: "Defying Gravity"
2014	The Magnificent Eleven	Larry	
2015–2016	Emmerdale	Gordon Livesy	
2023	Vera	Gerry Farr	Episode: “Blue”
