= Accident Man =

2018 film by Jesse V. Johnson

- Film poster
- Directed by: Jesse V. Johnson
- Screenplay by: Stu Small; Scott Adkins
- Based on: Accident Man by: Pat Mills; Tony Skinner
- Produced by: Scott Adkins; Craig Baumgarten; Erik Kritzer; Ben Jacques
- Starring: Scott Adkins; Ray Stevenson; David Paymer; Michael Jai White; Ashley Greene
- Cinematography: Duane McClunie
- Edited by: Matthew Lorentz
- Music by: Sean Murray
- Production companies: Link Entertainment; Six Demon Films
- Distributed by: Destination Films; Sony Pictures Home Entertainment
- Release dates: 6 February 2018 (United States); 16 April 2018 (United Kingdom)
- Running time: 105 minutes
- Countries: United Kingdom; United States
- Language: English

Accident Man is a 2018 martial arts action thriller film directed by Jesse V. Johnson, based on characters created by Pat Mills and Tony Skinner. The film stars Scott Adkins, Ray Stevenson, David Paymer, Michael Jai White, and Ashley Greene. The film was released by Sony Pictures Home Entertainment on 6 February 2018 in the United States, and on 16 April 2018 in the United Kingdom, where it received positive reviews from critics and audiences with praise for cast performances and action sequences.

A sequel, Accident Man: Hitman's Holiday, was released on 14 October 2022.

== Plot ==
Mike Fallon is an assassin who specializes in disguising his kills as accidents, and he is a regular at an assassins' pub called Oasis, where retired Big Ray is the bartender. Fellow regulars include Carnage Cliff, who kills his victims with an axe; Poison Pete; military veterans Mick and Mac; Finnicky Fred, who invents and sells unorthodox weapons; and Jane the Ripper, an expert swordswoman. After killing an accountant named Archie Rudd, Mike gets a call from Milton, who assigns the assassins their missions. Milton asks Mike to receive his payment for the kill in an alleyway, but Mike is attacked by an amateur assassin, whom he kills easily.

Mike accuses Milton of setting him up, but Milton denies this. Mike learns that his ex-girlfriend Beth has been murdered in a botched burglary and was pregnant with his child. Hearing that the alleged perpetrators overdosed immediately afterwards, Mike becomes suspicious and steals the police report, where he deduces that Mick and Mac were responsible, as they specialize in disguising assassinations as random street crimes. Mike accuses Mick and Mac, and they confess to killing Beth, but deny knowledge of their client's identity. Enraged, Mike fights and defeats them, and Big Ray reminds Mike never to get emotionally involved in his line of work.

Mike goes to Beth's apartment and asks her girlfriend Charlie whether Beth's environmentalist activities made her enemies. They argue until Cliff breaks in and attacks Charlie. Mike inadvertently kills Cliff, tracks down Milton, and tortures him to reveal who ordered the hit on Beth, a man named Leonard Kent. Big Ray reluctantly orders a hit on Mike for killing Cliff.

Flashback: Years earlier, 15-year-old Mike worked as a paperboy and was bullied every day on his route. While hiding from his bullies, Mike noticed a man mysteriously walking away from a house that exploded moments later. After recording and spying on him for weeks, Mike confronted the man and blackmailed him to teach him to become an assassin. Big Ray took him as an apprentice and had him kill the bullies' leader as his first kill. Ray kept photographs incriminating Mike in the murder, and warned Mike to never betray him. Ray taught Mike what he needed to be a professional assassin and became a father figure to Mike.

Back in the present, Charlie reveals that Beth had collected information on Pankot Petroleum, a corrupt Indian oil company, provided by Archie Rudd. Mike confronts Kent, who turns over a recording of another man ordering him to have Beth killed. Suddenly, Mick and Mac arrive and kill Kent, leading to Mac getting killed in friendly fire and Mike bludgeoning Mick with a fire extinguisher.

Pete ambushes Mike outside the building, but he kills him easily. Mike spares Fred by knocking him out and goes to the house of Kent's employer and an oil tycoon Atal Zim, where he kills Jane with her own katana and rejects Zim's bribery attempts and decapitates him.

Back at the Oasis, Mike confronts Milton and plays the rest of Kent's recording, revealing that Milton had ordered to kill Mike in the alleyway and assigned Mick, Mac, and Cliff to eliminate all loose ends. Enraged, Big Ray assaults Milton and Mike offers him a band-aid that Fred had developed for poisoning. Milton applies the bandage and slowly dies. Big Ray allows Mike to leave, but warns him to never return to Oasis. Mike leaves and vows to protect the city as a vigilante.

== Cast ==
- Scott Adkins as Mike Fallon / Accident Man
  - Leon Finnan as Young Mike Fallon
- Ashley Greene as Charlie Adams
- Ray Stevenson as Ray "Big Ray"
- Michael Jai White as Mick, an American Special Ops assassin who specializes in Taekwondo as well as chemicals
- Ray Park as Mac, a Special Ops assassin who specialises in Taekwondo as well as chemicals
- David Paymer as Milton
- Perry Benson as Fred "Finicky Fred", an assassin who specialises in inventing and selling unorthodox weapons
- Roger Yuan as Swordsmaster
- Amy Johnston as Jane "The Ripper", an assassin who specialises in katana
- Ravi Aujla as Atal Zim, an oil tycoon
- Nick Moran as Leonard Kent
- Ross O'Hennessy as Cliff "Carnage Cliff"
- Jamie Long as Spence, the police officer

== Production ==
The film went into production under Link Entertainment and Six Demon Films' management. Scott Adkins produced, wrote the screenplay, and stars in this comic-strip adaptation. Ashley Greene also joined the cast. In November 2016, a film adaptation went into production in London, directed by Jesse V. Johnson, with a screenplay written by Stu Small and Scott Adkins.

== Release ==
The film was released on DVD, Blu-ray, and video on demand by Sony Pictures Home Entertainment on 6 February 2018 in the United States and on 16 April 2018 in the United Kingdom.

== Reception ==
On the review aggregator website Rotten Tomatoes, 71% of 7 critics' reviews are positive, with an average rating of 5.7/10.

Fred Topel of We Live Entertainment wrote, "I certainly hope there are more Accident Man movies, but I always hope there are more Scott Adkins movies. This is certainly a fun universe for him to play in, and we could see Fallon cause more accidents and fight more rejects of the Oasis." Sol Harris of Starburst wrote: "For all its flaws, Accident Man ultimately succeeds on the charms of its cast and by successfully landing jokes and punches in tandem."

== Sequel ==
In March 2019, Johnson confirmed that Sony had approved the development of Accident Man 2 and that Smalls was writing a script.

In November 2021, the film went into production in Malta, directed by the Kirby brothers (George and Harry), and also with a screenplay written by Small and Adkins.

Accident Man: Hitman's Holiday was released on 14 October 2022 in select theatres and on video on demand. Reviews were generally positive.
