= Ross O'Hennessy =

Welsh actor

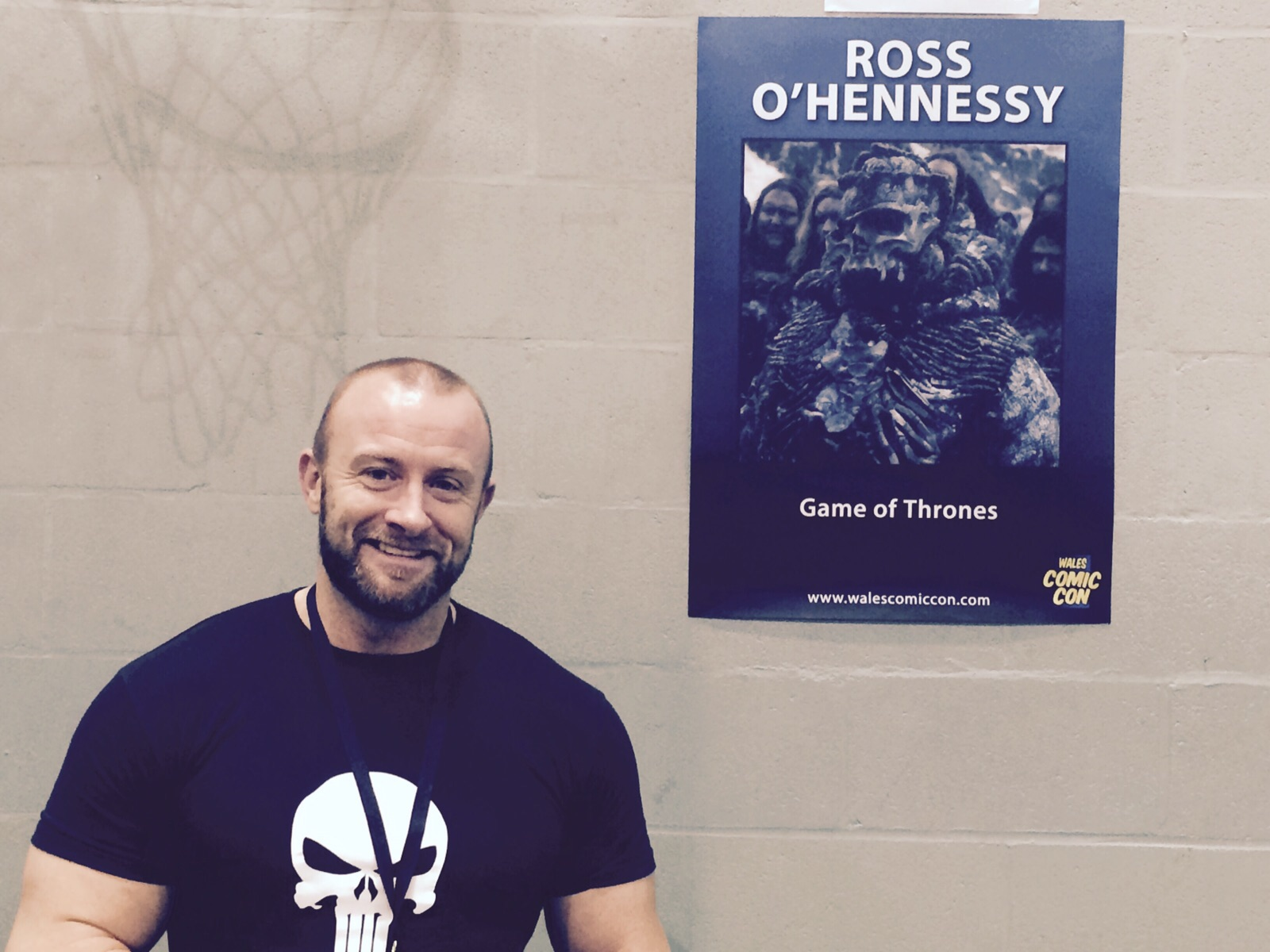
- O'Hennessy at Wales Comic Con 2015
- Born: 1974 (age 51–52); Pontllanfraith, Wales
- Education: Mountview Theatre School
- Occupation: Actor

Ross O'Hennessy (born 1974) is a Welsh actor. He is best known for playing the role of Lord of Bones in Game of Thrones.

He played roles in Hollyoaks Later, Da Vinci's Demons, The Musketeers, and playing the blood thirsty role of Sir Locke in Kurt Sutter's international television series The Bastard Executioner.

In 2015, he replaced Edward Dogliani as Lord of Bones in Season 5 of the HBO series Game of Thrones. Since appearing in Game of Thrones Ross O'Hennessy has been cast to play the vicious character of Carnage Cliff in the feature film adaption of the comic book Accident Man.

== Early life ==
O'Hennessy was born into a working class Welsh family but by the age 16 knew he wanted to spend his time acting. At the age of 18 he left Wales and moved to London to chase his career. He was accepted into the National Youth Theatre, where he was tutored by actor Hakeem Kae-Kazim and performed in Maggie May, The Tempest and Macbeth in London. From these plays Ross won a scholarship from Sir John Mills and The Stage newspaper which enabled him to attend a three-year acting course at the Mountview Academy of Theatre Arts.

== Early career ==
O'Hennessy picked up a career in the theatre and gained his first appearance at Chichester Festival Theatre in a play called The Visit in which he acted opposite Hollywood actress Lauren Bacall which was directed by Terry Hands. With such a big production came a lot of attention for Ross and so he was asked the join The Royal Shakespeare Company where he performed in As You Like It directed by Steven Pimlott, Three Hours After Marriage directed by Richard Cottrell and Troilus and Cressida directed by Ian Judge.

== Television and film appearances ==
O'Hennessy very quickly moved into the world of television and film with his first television appearance being as Cpl Dando on Soldier Soldier in 1995 to 1997. He continued to work as a typical television jobbing actor until he got his big break in 2011 playing the role of Bruce Maverick in Hollyoaks Later. He was asked to play the role of Commander Quattrone in Da Vinci's Demons. having played this powerful role in such a big budget production allowed O'Hennessy to move into performances like Rattle Shirt - The Lord of Bones in Game of Thrones.

O'Hennessy has completed work in 2015 on the BBC Musketeers and has begun working on Kurt Sutter's new show all about the medieval times. O'Hennessy plays Sir Locke in this new FX production called The Bastard Executioner.

== Charity Work ==
O'Hennessy is an active supporter of the arts and took part in a charity campaign to save his local theatre where he first started acting at the age of 15. O'Hennessy hosted a 'Game of Thrones' event where he came to auction Game of Thrones memorabilia and photos. He hosted a charity signing plus a question and answer session. The theatre was successful in its campaign and the Blackwood Little theatre was saved.

== Personal Appearances ==
O'Hennessy made his first fan based personal appearance at the Wrexham Comic Con event in November 2015.

== Filmography ==
=== Film ===
Year	Title	Role	Notes
2001	Conspiracy	Adjutant SS Officer	TV movie
2008	Clapham Junction	Merv	TV movie
2009	I Know You Know	The Desk Sgt.	Feature Film
2009	Colonial Gods	Construction Manager	Short Film
2014	The Adventurer: The Curse of the Midas Box	Team Member	Feature Film
2014	Narcopolis	Officer Archer	Feature Film
2015	Our Father	Sergeant Browning	Short Film
2016	Knights of the Damned	Sir Richard	Feature Film
2016	The Lost Viking	Wyman	Feature Film
2018	Accident Man	Carnage Cliff	Feature Film
2017	The Dark Kingdom	Sir Richard	Feature Film
2018	Boudicca's Fury	Vasseddo	TV movie
2018	Mission: Impossible – Fallout	British Agent	Feature Film
2018	Backdraft 2	Jack	Feature Film
2019	Avengement	Evans	Feature Film
2018	Dragonheart: Vengeance	The Bear	Feature Film
2019	Jungle Cry	Tim Harris	Feature Film
2019	Tribal	Brad Johnson	Feature Film
2020	Ballard of Billy McCrea	Tom Carpenter	Feature Film
2020	The Loss Adjuster	Mr Gimpole	Feature Film
2024	Protein	Nik	Feature Film

=== Television ===
Year	Title	Role
1995-1997	Soldier Soldier	Cpl Dando
1998	Killer Net	Bouncer
2001	Lexx	Cedric
2003	Mile High	Crazy Rugby Fan
2003	Roger Roger	Policeman
2004	Rosemary and Thyme	P.C. Donald Stuart
2005	Bad Girls	Security Officer
2005	The Giblet Boys	Mr Saunders
2006	Caerdydd	John Davies - Immigration Officer
2006	Torchwood	Sgt. Johnson
2007	Belonging	John the Foreman
2012	Hollyoaks Later	Bruce Maverick
2013-2014	Da Vinci's Demons	Commander Quattrone
2014	Holby City	Barry Mackenzie
2015	Game of Thrones	RattleShirt - Lord of Bones
2015	The Bastard Executioner	Locke
2015	The Musketeers	Barbier
2020	Hanna	Camp Guard
2020	Absentia	Armstrong
2027	Bloodaxe	Rolf Ragnavaldsson
