= Blue Murder (2000 film) =

- Genre: Crime drama
- Written by: Nick Collins
- Directed by: Paul Unwin
- Starring: Gary Mavers; Jemma Redgrave; Tim Woodward; Sheila Ballantine; Julie Bramall; Flaminia Cinque; Claire Cox; Emma Cunniffe
- Composer: Colin Towns
- Country of origin: United Kingdom
- Original language: English

Production
- Executive producer: Sharon Bloom
- Producer: Christopher Hall
- Editor: Chris Blunden
- Running time: 100 minutes
- Production company: Carlton Television

Original release
- Network: ITV
- Release: 23 February 2000

Blue Murder is a single British television crime drama film, written by Nick Collins, that first broadcast on ITV on 23 February 2000. The film follows Gale (Jemma Redgrave), a woman who plans to murder her husband with the help of her lover, Adam (Gary Mavers), who is also a police officer. The film was directed by Paul Unwin and drew 7.32 million viewers on its original broadcast.

Actress Jemma Redgrave said of the role; "Gale is completely cold-hearted and calculating, which was an irresistible challenge after playing someone was intensely warm as Eleanor in Bramwell. I really liked the contrast, plus the fact that Gale was so open to interpretation. She's a real chameleon. Just as you think you’re working her out, she changes again." The film was released on VHS on 22 May 2000. This remains the only home video release to date.

== Plot ==
Gale (Jemma Redgrave) is trapped in a loveless marriage to a powerful and wealthy Ben (Tim Woodward). Tired of living under the thumb, she conspires with her lover Adam (Gary Mavers), with whom she has been having an affair, to plot the perfect murder. There is only one problem: Adam is a police officer. As he tries to talk Gale out of the ludicrous plan, he finds himself being drawn into her world of murder and betrayal. Convinced that Ben is a bully and a cheat, Adam and Gale work together to plot the murder. The deed is carried out, and to his relief, Adam's team are called to investigate. Adam is delighted when it appears that the team are nowhere close to identifying the killer – until his colleague Vanessa (Emma Cunniffe) makes a major breakthrough and finds a major discrepancy in Gale's version of events. And with a potential new witness coming forward, Gale's number appears to be up. But, as her fate appears to be sealed, Adam discovers she could possibly be involved in another murder.

== Cast ==
- Gary Mavers as DS Adam Ross
- Jemma Redgrave as Gale Francombe
- Tim Woodward as Ben Francombe
- Sheila Ballantine as Morna
- Julie Bramall as Abbey
- Flaminia Cinque as Carla
- Claire Cox as Jenny
- Emma Cunniffe as Vanessa
- Sean McGinley as Shelley
- Kevin McMonagle as Pascoe
- Ash Tandon as Lawrence Farren
