= Flaminia Cinque =

English actress

- Born: Cambridge, Cambridgeshire, England
- Education: Bristol Old Vic Theatre School
- Occupation: Actress
- Years active: 1988–present
- Partners: Gerald Heward

Flaminia Cinque (/ˈtʃɪŋkweɪ/) is an English actress.

She is known for films such as Bridget Jones: The Edge of Reason, Accident Man: Hitman's Holiday, Leap Year, What a Girl Wants, Made in Italy and the television programmes: Midsomer Murders, Coronation Street, Toast of Tinseltown, Drop the Dead Donkey EastEnders, Casualty, and Doctors. Her voice roles include Lillian Gopher and Merv Wombat in Gophers!, Flamingo in Tinga Tinga Tales and Ester in the children's animated television series Thomas & Friends.

Cinque, along with actor Vincenzo Nicoli, has appeared in The Knot, Leap Year, Holy Cannelloni, and Brothers of Italy.

== Early life ==
Cinque studied acting at the Bristol Old Vic Theatre School.

== Career ==
She began her acting career in 1988 after graduating from college. Winner of the Peter Ackerman Comedy Prize in 1988 for her stage performances of Mae West in Happy as a Sandbag and Hermia in A Midsummer Night's Dream, she worked with Sir Peter Hall for the first of four times in Tennessee Williams' The Rose Tattoo in London's West End and took over the leading role when Julie Walters had to pull out of the production.

She has played the open air amphitheatre at Epidavros in Greece in Lysistrata and the New Victory Theatre, Broadway, New York in More Grimm Tales. She was invited to join the Comedy Store Players in 2000.

She was part of the original cast of David Hare's The Permanent Way at the National Theatre in London UK, which toured to Sydney, Australia and played Conchalla in the first UK production of Sam Shepard's The Late Henry Moss at the Almeida Theatre, in London, UK.

Her television appearances include Any Human Heart, Ultimate Force, The Ruth Rendell Mysteries, The Bill, EastEnders, Doctors and New Tricks.

Cinque played three characters in the program Casualty for 3 different episodes. She portrayed Rita in the BBC miniseries Man in an Orange Shirt.

Her film appearances include Mr. Bean's Holiday, Bridget Jones: The Edge of Reason, Show Dogs, What a Girl Wants, Leap Year Made in Italy, Accident Man: Hitman's Holiday and The Knot. She appeared in the BBC Radio 4 Program All the Young Dudes as Maria, which ran from 2001 to 2002.

Cinque appeared in the 2022 action film Accident Man: Hitman's Holiday as Mrs. Zuzzer, with Scott Adkins, and the 2011 action film Attack the Block, with Jodie Whittaker, Nick Frost and newcomer John Boyega. She also appeared as Mamma Rosa in the charming and hilarious comedy "Holy Cannelloni", written and directed by Carolina Giammetta.

She joined the voice cast of Thomas & Friends as the voice of Ester in the UK & US dubs, respectively. She also narrates books for the Live Streaming Service "Bookstreamz.com".

== Personal life ==
From 1997, she was the London Correspondent/translator and presenter for the Bandini Committee (an outfit which awards rookie Formula 1 drivers in the name of the legendary F1 driver Lorenzo Bandini who lost his life at the Monte Carlo Grand Prix of 1967).

Flaminia also sat for the esteemed Portuguese born artist Paula Rego several times, including for the picture "Lush", which was part of the "Dog Woman" series, and as the Dancing Hippo in the tribute to Fantasia for the 100 year celebration of cinema held at the Southbank.

== Filmography ==
=== Film ===
Year	Title	Role	Notes
1992	Road Trip	Beautiful Italian	Short film
1996	Candysack	Italian Marilyn Monroe Impersonator (voice)	Direct-to-video
2000	Room to Rent	Margreta	
2000	Chicken Run	Additional Chicken (voice)	Uncredited
2003	What a Girl Wants	Caterer	
2004	Bridget Jones: The Edge of Reason	Corset Lady	
2006	Wednesday	Janice	Short film
2007	Mr. Bean's Holiday	Hotel Maid	
2007	Cake	Giulina	Short film
2010	Leap Year	Carla	
2012	Tezz	Passenger #5	
2012	The Knot	Mrs. Fernandez	
2016	Worst Fears	Janice	Direct-to-video; Segment #2: "Wednesday"
2018	Show Dogs	Spa Manager	
2018	Brothers of Italy	Maddalena Petrucco	Short film
2019	Thomas & Friends: Digs and Discoveries	Ester (voice)	UK/US versions
2019	Holy Cannelloni	Mamma Rosa	Short film
2020	Made in Italy	Deli Owner	
2022	Accident Man: Hitman's Holiday	Mrs. Zuzzer	

=== Television ===
Year	Title	Role	Notes
1990	Gophers!	Lillian Gopher, Merv Wombat (voices)	4 episodes
1996	Drop the Dead Donkey	Marika	Episode: "The Graveyard Shift"
1997	Sunnyside Farm	Conchita	Episode: "He's Heavy, He's My Brother"
1997	Mr. White Goes to Westminster	Pizza Delivery Woman	Television movie
1998	The Bill	Olivia	Episode: "A Rainy Night in Sun Hill"
1999	The Ruth Rendell Mysteries	Kate	Episodes: "The Lake of Darkness: Parts 1 & 2"
2000	Blue Murder	Carla	Television movie
2002	TLC	Gasman's Patient	Episode: "Agency Nurse"
2005	Casualty	Beth Mather	Episode: "Secrets That We Keep"
2005	Waking the Dead	Rebecca Fairclough	Episodes: "Undertow: Parts 1 & 2"
2006	Ultimate Force	Mrs. Guggenheim	Episode: "Charlie Bravo"
2008	Doctors	Deidre Hunter	Episode: "Big Momma"
2011	Tinga Tinga Tales	Flamingo (voice)	4 episodes
2013	Doctors	Inez De la Candia	Episode: "Whose Closet Is It Anyway?"
2015	Casualty	Elaine Buono	Uncredited; Episode: "A Child's Heart: Part 1"
2015	Suspicion	Toni	Episode: "Edge of Insanity"
2015	Obsession: Dark Desires	Hannah	Television documentary series Episode: "Cross Your Heart & Hope To Die"
2016	Doctors	Rita Holswell	Episode: "Not Educating Rita"
2016	The Moonstone	Italian Mother	Episode: "#1.1"
2017	Man in an Orange Shirt	Rita	Television movie
2017	The Pact	Fatima	Television movie
2018	EastEnders	DC Allingham	Episode: "29 June 2018: Part 1"
2019–2021	Thomas & Friends	Ester, Dame Bella Canto (voices)	UK/US versions
2020	Doctors	May James	Episode: "Tough Choices"
2020	Alex Rider	Housekeeper at Friend Mansion	Episode: "Episode 3"
2020	Trickster	Narrator	8 episodes
2020	A Short Film About Serial Killing	Narrator	Unknown episodes
2020	Wuthering Heights	Zillah	2 episodes
2022	Toast of Tinseltown	Phyllis Willis	Episode: "Doctor Grainger"
2022	Doctors	Janette Draper	Episode: "Letherbridge, We Have a Problem"
2022	Midsomer Murders	Mama Cignoni	Episode: "A Grain of Truth"
2023	Coronation Street	Isabella Benvenuti	10 episodes
2024	Brassic	Mrs. Calvo	Episode: "That Night"

=== Video games ===
Year	Title	Role	Notes
1997	Broken Sword II: The Smoking Mirror	Additional Voices (voice)	
