= Accident Man: Hitman's Holiday =

- Poster
- Directed by: George Kirby; Harry Kirby
- Screenplay by: Stu Small; Scott Adkins
- Based on: Characters by: Pat Mills; Tony Skinner
- Produced by: Scott Adkins; Craig Baumgarten; Erik Kritzer; Ben Jacques; Joe Karimi-Nik
- Starring: Scott Adkins; Ray Stevenson; Perry Benson; Sarah Chang
- Cinematography: Richard C Bell
- Edited by: George Kirby; Harry Kirby
- Music by: John Koutselinis
- Production companies: Link Entertainment; Six Demon Films; Wonder Street; Fiction Films
- Distributed by: Samuel Goldwyn Films; Destination Films
- Release dates: October 14, 2022 (United States); October 24, 2022 (United Kingdom)
- Running time: 96 minutes
- Countries: United Kingdom; United States
- Language: English

Accident Man: Hitman's Holiday (also known as Accident Man 2) is a 2022 martial arts action comedy thriller directed by Kirby Brothers and starring Scott Adkins (who also co-wrote the script with Stu Small), Ray Stevenson (in his final film released during his lifetime), Perry Benson and Sarah Chang. It is the sequel to Jesse V. Johnson's 2018 film Accident Man. The film was shot in Valletta, Malta. The film was released on 14 October 2022, in the United States and 24 October 2022, in the United Kingdom.

== Plot ==
Dealing with his guilt after being forced to kill his assassin coworkers, Mike Fallon moves to the island of Malta to decompress and get away from London, finding work as a hitman-for-hire in nearby countries and keeping martial artist Wong Siu-ling on his payroll to fight him at random times and keep his skills sharp. One night, Mike runs into his old friend Finicky Fred, who informs him that their former boss Big Ray lost his assassin's bar after Mike's vengeful rampage. Fred is also out of money because he gave a large sum to a woman with whom he fell in love online. Mike takes pity on Fred and allows him to stay in his house and assist him on hits. The two put together a secret headquarters to test out Fred's gadgets and plan jobs.

On Mike's advice, Fred rejects a contract put out on Dante Zuuzer, the spoiled heir to a Cosa Nostra organization that even Mike fears. After carrying out another hit, Mike and Fred are abducted and taken to meet with Mrs. Zuuzer, who asks Mike to hunt down and kill whoever took out the contract on Dante in exchange for sparing Fred's life; an attempted hit on Dante had been carried out using Mike's modus operandi. The Zuuzers release Mike, who encounters Big Ray in his local pub - Fred had sent a letter to Ray explaining their new business operation against Mike's advice. Ray vows revenge on Mike, revealing that he is in Malta for a job, and Mike deduces he was behind the attempt on Dante's life. Ray explains that the client has raised the bounty to €9 million and opened the contract to any takers, as well as hacked into the tracking device in Dante's watch to broadcast his location.

Mike resolves to protect Dante in order to keep Fred alive. Mike arrives at the karaoke bar where Dante sings, but Dante refuses to destroy his watch and swallows it. Freya du Preeze arrives first and kills Dante's team of bodyguards before Mike fights and kills her with a barbecue skewer. Mike then forces Dante to take a laxative in order to pass the watch, but the two are accosted by blood-drinking Yendi the Vampire, who Mike kills with his own machete. They travel to Mike's headquarters, hoping to keep Dante secure, where Mike meets Siu-ling. Mike fights Poco the Killer Clown and kills him with one of Fred's previously broken gadgets, while Siu-ling fights rival assassin Silas the Strangler and strangles him to death with a heavy chain. Dante manages to pass the watch before nearly being killed by swordsman Oyumi.

Mike challenges him to a hand-to-hand fight for Dante's life, but receives a beating before Big Ray arrives and kills Oyumi with a shotgun. Ray attempts to kill Dante, but Mike convinces him to stand down for Fred and destroy the tracking device. Mike, Ray, and Siu-ling transport Dante to Mrs. Zuuzer to exchange him for Fred; Mrs. Zuuzer orders Mike and Fred to leave the island, but Ray detonates an explosive that Fred had planted in Dante's suit, killing Dante and Mrs. Zuuzer and earning them the €9 million bounty. Fred meets the woman he fell in love with online, but Mike explains that she left him after learning he was an assassin. In a voiceover, Mike tells that the bounty allowed him, Fred and Ray to set up a new assassins' organization and move on to the next chapter of their lives.

== Cast ==
- Scott Adkins as Mike Fallon / The Accident Man
- Ray Stevenson as Ray "Big Ray", Mike's maniacal father figure and mentor from the first film. This was Stevenson's last film released prior to his death in May 2023.
- Perry Benson as Fred "Finicky Fred", Mike's colleague from the first film who specializes in unorthodox weapons
- Sarah Chang as Wong Siu-Ling, a descendant of Kung-Fu master Wong Fei-Hung who ultimately becomes Mike's sidekick
- George Fouracres as Dante Zuzzer
- Flaminia Cinque as Mrs. Zuzzer
- Beau Fowler as Poco "The Killer Clown", a highly durable killer clown who carries a giant hammer as his main weapon and was believed by many to be an urban legend
- Faisal Muhammed as Yendi / The Vampire, an assassin from Ghana who enjoys consuming blood
- Andreas Nguyen as Oyumi, an assassin with Japanese origins whose fighting style is based on Ninjutsu and an old acquaintance of Mike
- Peter Lee Thomas as Silas / San Francisco's Strangler, an assassin who prefers to strangle his victims to death and an old acquaintance of Mike
- Zara Phythian (officially uncredited) as Freya du Preeze / The Angel of Death, a highly skilled assassin claimed to have been trained in the dark arts by those who viewed James Bond as a "muppet" and an old acquaintance of Mike

== Production ==
Filming began in November 2021 in Malta, although the COVID-19 pandemic prevented it.

== Music ==
MovieScore Media released a digital soundtrack album on November 9, 2022, that featured the film’s original score composed by John Koutselinis (Hostile Territory, The Great Alaskan Race, Deus). Also included was the Accident Man theme by Sean Murray (who scored the original 2018 movie) and two songs by Atomic.

== Track listing ==
All music is composed by John Koutselinis, unless where specified.

Accident Man: Hitman's Holiday (Original Motion Picture Soundtrack)
No.	Title	Length
1.	"Back in the Race - Atomic"	2:26
2.	"Kill Mode – Engaged (Mike v Oyumi)"	2:28
3.	"Accident Man – Theme"	2:46
4.	"A Brand New Life & Mike’s Arch Enemy"	2:23
5.	"Introducing Siu-ling"	1:14
6.	"The (Preposterous) Adventures of Super-Fred!!!"	2:12
7.	"Taking Out Mr McKelleph"	0:49
8.	"On the Phone to Mrs Zuuzer"	1:18
9.	"The Bath Hit"	0:59
10.	"Mike v Freya"	3:47
11.	"The Exchange"	1:39
12.	"Mike v Yendi"	3:46
13.	"Introducing Oyumi & Confronting Big Ray"	3:53
14.	"Blown to Bits"	0:48
15.	"Gimme Your Love – Atomic"	3:08
Total length:		33:00

The two songs by Atomic were also released bundled in EP form, which included an instrumental of their 2011 song, "Heartbeater", as well.

Despite not being included in the soundtrack album, the band "Are We Superheroes?" also contributed music for the film, and also released an EP including 4 original songs:

1. Biff Bang Pow! (2:32)

2. I Want More (2:35)

3. Judy in the Starry Skies (3:27)

4. Biff Bang Pow! (Feat. Segs) (2:58)

"Biff Bang Pow!" is the only one of their songs actually included in the film itself.

== Reception ==
On the review aggregator website Rotten Tomatoes, 80% of 15 critics' reviews are positive, with an average rating of 6/10.
