= Apocalypse Ltd =

British publishing company

- Founded: 1990
- Defunct: 1991
- Country of origin: United Kingdom
- Headquarters location: Leicester
- Key people: Pat Mills, John Wagner, Alan Grant, Kevin O'Neill
- Publication types: Comics
- Owner: Neptune Distribution

Apocalypse Ltd was a short-lived publishing company formed out of an alliance of Pat Mills, John Wagner, Alan Grant and Kevin O'Neill. Apocalypse was an offshoot of Neptune Distribution, based in South Wigston, Leicester. Apocalypse was meant to provide titles such as Mills and O'Neill's Marshal Law (originally published by the Marvel Comics imprint Epic Comics) a way to avoid dealing with the big companies such as Marvel and DC Comics. All of Apocalypse's titles were creator-owned; the most notable title being the weekly comic Toxic!. Neptune also owned Trident Comics, which printed black-and-white comics by mainly new, unpublished creators.

== History ==
The first title released by Apocalypse was a Marshal Law special titled Kingdom of the Blind, published in October 1990. This was followed by the first issue of Toxic! in March 1991.

Toxic! was initially popular, although some of the material proved controversial due to subject matter and portrayals of violence. This was not the only strip that suffered problems; Marshal Law began to miss issues, and some of the material replacing it proved not to be as popular. Some strips meant to be published by Trident Comics were even used to provide filler material. This hurt the title as although it had sold well initially, sales were dropping and it became clear that there were problems with Apocalypse paying creators. These problems meant many creators, such as Mike McMahon, saw work published which they had not been paid for.

Another title, Primal, created by Clive Barker, was never published, although it did later appear via Dark Horse Comics, which also picked up several of Toxic!'s other features.

Apocalypse went bankrupt in late 1991, leaving many creators unpaid; some of these people never worked in comics again.

== Titles ==
- Apocalypse Presents (8 issues)
1. Marshal Law: Kingdom of the Blind (October 1990) [As Toxic! Presents]
2. Marshal Law Takes Manhattan (March 1991)
3. Accident Man (June 1991)
4. Bogie Man (July 1991)
5. Accident Man: The Death Touch (August 1991)
6. Bogie Man: The Manhattan Project (September 1991)
7. Makabre (October 1991)
8. Sex Warrior (November 1991)
- Marshal Law: Hateful Dead (1 issue, 1991) — Reprints stories from Toxic! #1-8
- Toxic! (31 issues, March 28–October 24, 1991)
