= Neptune Distribution =

UK based Comic Distribution Company

Neptune Comic Distributors Ltd.
- Company type: Comic book distribution, Comics publishing
- Industry: Comics
- Founded: 1985; 41 years ago
- Fate: Acquired by Diamond Comic Distributors, 1991
- Headquarters: Leicester, United Kingdom
- Key people: Geoff Fry
- Products: Comics, Magazines and Related Merchandise
- Divisions: Trident Comics (1989–1991); Apocalypse Ltd (1990–1991)

Neptune Distribution was a UK based comic distribution company founded and headquartered in Leicester, which existed from 1985 to 1991.

== History ==
Neptune Comics (as it was named at the outset), began in 1985 as a small direct-to-consumer mail order company selling American comics to UK collectors at a time when there were few specialist retail outlets. In early 1986 Neptune Comics also began selling at regional Comic Marts in cities such as Leeds and Sheffield, and by mid-1986 began supplying retail outlets. Neptune acted as a sub-distributor in regard to American comics, initially acquiring them from Bud Plant Inc. (which was acquired by Diamond Comic Distributors in 1988).

The company was incorporated in the spring of 1987 as Neptune Comic Distributors Limited. By this point, Neptune's initial aim of challenging Titan Distribution's monopoly on the UK comic distribution business was well established.

Neptune expanded into publishing in 1989 with Trident Comics, and in late 1990 helped to found Apocalypse Ltd, which published Toxic!, a weekly title meant to compete with Fleetway Publications's 2000 AD.

=== Closure ===
The company expanded too quickly, however. Financial problems led the distribution side to stop importing American comics in July 1991, as it could not pay outstanding bills owed to Diamond. Soon after, Diamond absorbed Neptune; this British distribution base enabled Diamond to form Diamond UK. (Diamond next acquired Titan Distributors in 1993.)
