= Marshal Law =

Comic book series

Publication information
- Publisher: Marvel Comics; Dark Horse Comics; DC Comics
- Format: Monthly
- Genre: Superhero
- Publication date: 1987–1998

Creative team
- Created by: Pat Mills; Kevin O'Neill
- Written by: Pat Mills
- Artist: Kevin O'Neill
- Inkers: Kevin O'Neill; Mark Nelson (Marshal Law Takes Manhattan)
- Colorists: Kevin O'Neill; Mark Chiarello (Marshal Law Takes Manhattan); Steve Buccellato (Pinhead vs. Marshal Law); Dave Stewart (The Mask/Marshal Law)

Collected editions
- Fear and Loathing: ISBN 0-87135-676-7
- Blood, Sweat and Fears: ISBN 1-878574-95-7
- Fear Asylum: ISBN 1-84023-699-X

Marshal Law is an English-language superhero comic book series created by Pat Mills and Kevin O'Neill.

Marshal Law was first published by Marvel's Epic Comics imprint in 1987. The series is a satire on the superhero genre as well as a deconstruction of the superheroes of the Golden Age and Silver Age.

The series is characterized by its extreme graphic violence and nudity, and Mills' skewering of superhero conventions and US government policy and society.

== Publication history ==
Epic Comics launched Marshal Law in October 1987 as a six-issue limited series. It was followed by the Crime and Punishment: Marshal Law Takes Manhattan one-shot, in which most of Marvel Comics' major characters were parodied.

In 1991, Mills and O'Neill took the character to the fledgling Apocalypse Comics for another one-shot, Toxic! Presents: Marshal Law: Kingdom of the Blind #1. This was followed by a reprint of Marshal Law: Takes Manhattan as #2, after which the series continued as Apocalypse Presents for another six issues while the Marshall Law character moved to star in the lead feature of Toxic!, a weekly comic started in 1991. Toxic! proved to be short-lived and Apocalypse Comics went bankrupt in 1992. Mills and O'Neill then took Marshal Law to Dark Horse Comics, where the story in Toxic! was completed in late 1992. That year also saw the character return to Marvel for a two-issue series pitting Marshal Law against Clive Barker's Pinhead character.

Over the next few years, Marshal Law appeared in two more intercompany crossovers, one with the Savage Dragon and another with the Mask. In 2000, Mills and O'Neill took the character to the Cool Beans World website. The stories here were illustrated novellas, rather than actual comic strips, titled The Day Of The Dead (which was later published in a paperback edition) and Cloak Of Evil. The website closed in 2002.

== Plot ==
Cover of issue #4 of the original Epic Comic series

The title character, Marshal Law, is the government-sanctioned "super hero hunter" (a.k.a. law enforcement officer, or "cape killer") with superpowers in the city of San Futuro, the near-future metropolis built from the ruins of San Francisco following a massive earthquake. Law's job is to take down other superheroes who have gone rogue, which he does with maximum force and great pleasure. Aided by the wheelchair-using "Danny" and his physically imposing (but extremely polite) partner "Kiloton", the Marshal operates from a secret police precinct hidden below the city, dispensing just enough brutal justice to keep the city's many super-powered gangs in a balanced détente while safeguarding the ordinary citizenry.

Marshal Law's secret identity is Joe Gilmore, a former supersoldier consumed with self-hatred about being a superhero. In this world, superheroes are commonplace thanks to genetic engineering, much of the United States' armed forces having undergone the process. However, while their bodies may become super-powered, their minds remain exactly as they were, and in many cases the inability to feel pain causes the subjects to compensate by inflicting pain on others. Psychosis of varying degrees is also a common side-effect, and some subjects develop wildly uncontrollable superpowers.

The plot of the original six-issue series revolved around the Marshal's attempts to unmask the Sleepman, a serial killer and rapist who preys on women dressed as Celeste, the current girlfriend of the beloved superhero, Public Spirit. Marshal Law's loathing of the Public Spirit as standing for everything that is fraudulent and hypocritical about superheroes leads him to suspect the Spirit himself of being responsible for the Sleepman's crimes; without any proof, though, the guilty party goes unpunished until a surprising revelation from a former superheroine reveals that the Marshal's suspicions may not be too far from the truth.

While in the first series, the Marshal's primary nemeses are the Public Spirit and the Sleepman, he later faces off against Private Eye and The Persecutor. A recurring secondary adversary (initially treated seriously, though later becoming comic relief) is Suicida, a psychopathic ex-soldier who leads the murderous Gangreen street gang.

The plot of "Secret Tribunal" revolved around an orbiting incubation center that created and mentally programmed superheroes. It was under attack by a monster called The Incubus, which was defeated by Growing Boy.

== Cast ==
- Marshal Law (Joe Gilmore): A violent and uncharismatic lawman, dealing with the twisted superheroes of San Futuro while searching for an actual hero. His public unpleasantness contrasts with a strong internal moral compass. Despite his hatred of superheroes, Marshal Law begrudgingly admits that he is technically one himself, having been given super strength, a healing factor, and the ability to shut off his pain receptors by a military experiment. Like many boys of his generation, Marshal Law was inspired by the Public Spirit to join the military to fight communist insurgents in "The Zone", an unstable area of South America. The horrors of the war, combined with the atrocities that the deployed superheroes committed made Marshal Law realize that superheroes were as corruptible as anyone else, and upon coming home took a job with the San Futuro police to hunt heroes who stray from the path of justice.
- Public Spirit (Colonel Buck Caine): The world's most powerful and popular hero who was a product of US genetic engineering and copious steroid usage. Marshal Law regards him as corrupt and untrustworthy. Following the death of his fiancée and fellow superheroine, Virago, before he was sent on a space mission, he becomes a suspect behind the murders of strippers dressed like his new love, superheroine Celeste. Eventually, it is revealed that he tried to kill Virago himself, as she was pregnant, which would keep him from being able to participate in the space mission. She survived and took the identity of Mrs Mallon. The Sleepman is actually his son, Danny, and he intends to kill Celeste as revenge for his mother being left to die. At what was supposed to be his wedding to Celeste, the truth about Virago is revealed and he is humiliated. He tries to secretly flee the country, but is discovered at an airport, killing innocent people in his attempt to escape. Public Spirit is eventually killed by McGland after being defeated in a protracted fight with Marshal Law, during which Public Spirit finally admits that he hates his life as a superhero. He felt that responsibilities were foisted onto him that he could never live up to, and that he wanted to go to space to escape the prying eyes of the American public. Against Marshal Law’s wishes, McGland decides to make it appear that Public Spirit died defending the airport from a terrorist attack, and to hush up his connection to The Sleepman. It is revealed later that most of the world's superheroes know the truth, and all but his most ardent followers do not care.
- The Sleepman: A serial killer wearing a metallic costume, black cape, and a brown paper bag over his head under which is a second mask. He rapes and murders women who dress like Celeste. As he is a superhero who can fly, Marshal Law suspects him to be Public Spirit, as flying superheroes are rare. He has a deep-seated loathing of himself and all superheroes, and longs to be stopped by Marshal Law. He rapes and kills Lynn Evans to motivate his idol, with the ultimate goal of goading him into an epic showdown that would go down in history as one of the greatest superhuman battles of all time. It is eventually revealed that he is Marshal Law's supposedly crippled friend, Danny. Danny is actually the Public Spirit's son with his supposedly dead former fiancée, Virago, who had inherited both of his parents' powers and thus is the most powerful superhuman in existence. Virago survived Public Spirit's attempt to kill her (he did so because her pregnancy would preclude him from going on a space mission) and raised Danny in secret. While only a few years would pass to Public Spirit and the crew, more than two decades would pass on Earth, hence Danny is roughly the same age as his father. His mother encourages him to kill strippers who look like Public Spirit's current fiancée, Celeste, as practice for when he murders the real Celeste. At the end of the first six issue arc, The Sleepman is believed to have been killed by Marshall Law after being shot and falling into the sea, but was actually taken by Dr. Mendel to be studied and reeducated, as he has severe brain damage due to being submerged for twelve hours.
- Lynn Evans: Marshal Law's girlfriend, a college journalist and female rights activist who is openly critical of superheroes. They met when the great earthquake destroyed the wall separating their apartments. She does not know he is a superhero, and openly voices her distaste for Marshal Law as a fascist thug. She is killed by The Sleepman while protesting Celeste, her death affecting Marshal Law greatly. She, along with multiple dead heroes, is eventually revived as a zombie, but the process transformed her into a twisted parody of her former self, turning her into an anarchistic supervillainess before she is put down by Marshal Law.
- Mrs. Mallon: A shopkeeper who resents superheroes but seems to enjoy the company of Marshal Law due to his work as a hunter of heroes. Her only known relative is her son Danny. It is eventually revealed that she is Virago, the first true superheroine and former fiancée of Public Spirit whom supposedly died more than twenty years before the main events of the series. She and Buck were raised together as children in a lab, growing up as siblings before becoming lovers. She was supposed to have drowned while the two superheroes were flying in a storm. Her pregnancy would have stopped Public Spirit from going into outer space (even though he would have aged only a few years, due to nature of the space travel, more than two decades would have passed on Earth so anyone with a family was ineligible). She raised Danny with a hatred of superheroes and encouraged him to kill women dressed like Celeste, the current lover of Public Spirit, in a plot to humiliate his father. She is killed by Public Spirit after the two began arguing about Danny and her revenge plot.
- Kiloton: The large partner of Marshal Law who watches their base below San Futuro. He is killed and mutilated by Private Eye after discovering his organ trafficking ring. Upon avenging his death, Marshal Law salutes him and calls him the only hero he had ever met, although he later considers Growing Boy to be a potential hero as well.
- Razorhead: A mercenary with the ability to grow blades out of his body. Razorhead was initially hired by the former sidekick of the Black Scarab to kill Marshal Law, but eventually sided with Law against the zombified Black Scarab and became Marshal Law's new partner.
- Celeste: The second fiancée of the Public Spirit and a member of a cult of heroines with sexual powers, often used as spies and assassins. She is killed (and presumably raped) by Sleepman on her wedding day.
- Gangreen Gang: A gang of costumed psychopaths who battle other super teams for the control of the dystopian San Futuro. They dress in matching green costumes and utilize explosive weaponry. Like Marshal Law, they are mostly veterans of the war in the Zone, but the Gangreen Gang have been reduced to petty crime after being unable to cope with civilian life.
- Growing Boy: A naive young hero who appears in Secret Tribunal, whose size-increasing power sometimes malfunctions. He is befriended by Marshal Law and grows to look up to him after seeing his hidden moral compass and sense of justice.
- The Private Eye: He appears in Kingdom of the Blind. The Private Eye is really Scott Brennan, billionaire and best friends with Public Spirit. Brennan got his inheritance after gunning down his abusive parents in an alley with the help of his butler and now battles the unwashed masses, whom he hates. He styles himself as being a moral doctor, using his father's own twisted experimental techniques to "cure" the city of petty crime by torturing and murdering the poor and downtrodden in gruesome ways. He also finances his ventures and keeps himself fighting by stealing the organs of his young orphan sidekicks, selling the parts he doesn't need to other heroes. Initially, Law is not suspicious of him due to their similarities, but after Kiloton exposes Private Eye's child organ trafficking operation, Marshal Law goes on a warpath to kill him. The Private Eye manages to kill Kiloton before being killed by Marshal Law, who knocks him into an industrial meat grinder.
- The Persecutor (Don Matrione) is a vigilante and an old acquaintance of Marshal Law from his time in the military. The Persecutor was a torture technician, who was employed by the CIA to prop up several South American dictatorships, which were friendly to America. His family was assassinated by vengeful revolutionaries, who had tracked him back to America. In his grief, Matrione was driven insane and after hearing a speech by the Public Spirit, came to believe all of his problems were the result of foreigners and members of the counter-culture, refusing to believe himself to be at fault for anything and thus developing a "persecution complex". He then became the Persecutor, a violent neo-nazi vigilante, who kills minorities and left-leaning Americans that he blames for all the country's ills regardless of whether or not they are committing a crime. He was hounded by Marshal Law in "Marshal Law takes Manhattan" for killing Hispanic protesters and checks himself into a maximum security superhero asylum to try and escape him. Law eventually finds him and, after a drawn-out fight in the burning asylum (during which The Persecutor discovers who Marshal Law is), he is defeated and handcuffed. The Persecutor again attempts to deny any wrongdoing and pleads to be let go, so Marshal Law shoves him out of his vehicle into a district full of homeless cannibals, where he is promptly skinned alive and roasted.
- Black Scarab is one of Marshal Law's previous enemies from before the series began. Originally, he was a superhero that Marshal Law killed for running a protection racket with his sidekick. He was revived as a zombie by his former sidekick so that they can kill Marshal Law. However, the undead hero reveals that there is no afterlife, causing him to throw off his nominal claims of heroism and instead plan to spread the "gift" of undeath to the world, freeing humanity of their shackles of mortality and morality. Fashioning himself as the "Pope of No Hope", he creates an army of undead "heroes" who have been driven insane by the oblivion of death and begin to besiege California in order to collect more soldiers. He is ultimately rekilled by Marshal Law, who obliterates him and his zombie army with his gunship.
- The Jesus Society of America is the first team of superheroes ever assembled during World War II, and is idolized as the pinnacle of patriotic heroism. In actuality, the JSA was completely incompetent, with their bright costumes and lack of combat training making them easy targets on the battlefield and thus prolonging the war by six months. Following the war's end, multiple scandals caused the remaining members of the group to be screened by the Committee for Unheroic Activities, leading several to commit suicide after their more unsavory personal lives were dredged up and many more to be sent to prison for crimes ranging from drug use to bestiality. The final remnants of the team then tried to take on the mafia to regain the love of the public, only to be wiped out entirely. Embarrassed, the military had the corpses embalmed and placed in a museum filled with falsified tales of their heroics for propaganda purposes, allowing time to erase the team's failures. They were eventually revived by Black Scarab as zombies, and proceeded to torture and murder the German and Asian-American tourists visiting the museum, believing themselves to be in an alternate universe where the Axis won the war. They then fight Marshal Law, who wipes them out with his superior technology and a tank on display at the museum, all while berating them for their hypocrisy and self-absorption. The few remaining members revive the normal soldiers buried on the grounds of the museum to try and get back-up, only to be ripped apart by them, as the vengeful soldiers had died because of the heroes' cowardice. The only members of the team to survive were the original Public Spirit and his sidekick/lover Private Dick, as they cryogenically froze themselves to be together forever.

== Publications ==
=== Comics ===
Original comic appearances:

- Marshal Law #1–6, Epic Comics, 1987–88
- Crime and Punishment: Marshal Law Takes Manhattan, one-shot, Epic Comics, 1989 (reprinted in 1991 as Marshal Law: Takes Manhattan by Apocalypse Comics)
- Marshal Law – Kingdom of the Blind, Apocalypse Comics, one-shot, 1990
- Toxic! #1–8, 14/15, Apocalypse Comics, 1991 (issues 14–15 reprint prologue from Fear and Loathing TPB with new framing sequences)
- Marshal Law – The Hateful Dead, one-Shot, Apocalypse Comics, 1991 (reprints Toxic! #1–8)
- Marshal Law – Super Babylon, one-shot, Dark Horse, 1992
- San Diego Comic-Con Comics #1, Dark Horse, 1992 (official appearance on cover and 1-page cameo)
- Pinhead vs. Marshal Law: Law in Hell, two issue series, Epic Comics, 1993
- Marshal Law – Secret Tribunal, two issue series, Dark Horse, 1994
- Savage Dragon/Marshal Law, two issue series, Image Comics, 1997
- The Mask/Marshal Law, two issue series, Dark Horse, 1998
- 2000 AD #1280, Rebellion Developments 2002 (1-page official cameo)

=== Novellas ===
A series of illustrated novellas were previously released on the now defunct Cool Beans World website. One of them was published in book form:

- Marshal Law – The Day of the Dead (Titan Books, 2004 ISBN 1-84023-636-1)
- Marshal Law – Cloak of Evil (Titan Books, 2006 ISBN 1-84023-683-3, scheduled but never published)

Print versions of both stories were published in the Marshal Law: Origins book, published in 2008 by Titan Books.

=== Collected editions ===
The comics have been collected into a number of trade paperbacks:

- Marshal Law – Fear and Loathing (collects Marshal Law #1–6 with new prologue, Epic Comics, 1990 ISBN 0-87135-676-7; Titan Books, 2002 ISBN 1-84023-452-0)
- Marshal Law – Blood, Sweat and Fears (collects Kingdom of the Blind, Hateful Dead, and Super Babylon, Dark Horse, 1993 ISBN 1-878574-95-7; Titan Books, 2003 ISBN 1-84023-526-8)
- Marshal Law – Fear Asylum (collects Takes Manhattan, Secret Tribunal, and The Mask vs., Titan Books, 2003 ISBN 1-84023-699-X)
- Marshal Law – Origins (Titan Books, 2008 ISBN 1-84576-943-0, collects the illustrated novellas The Day of the Dead and the previously unreleased Cloak of Evil)
- Marshal Law: The Deluxe Edition (collects Marshal Law #1–6, Takes Manhattan, Kingdom of the Blind, The Hateful Dead, Super Babylon, Secret Tribunal, DC Comics, HC April 2013 ISBN 978-1401238551, TPB December 2014 ISBN 978-1401251406)
