= Button Man =

Comic strip

Publication information
- Publisher: Rebellion Developments
- Schedule: Weekly
- Format: Anthology
- Genre: Crime
- Publication date: 1992 -

Creative team
- Created by: John Wagner; Arthur Ranson
- Written by: John Wagner
- Artist(s): Arthur Ranson; Frazer Irving
- Colourist: Fiona Staples (Book IV)

Collected editions
- The Killing Game: ISBN 1-904265-05-7
- The Confessions of Harry Exton: ISBN 1-905437-70-6

Button Man is a comics series that appeared in the British comic 2000 AD, written by John Wagner and illustrated by Arthur Ranson. The series is unrelated to the earlier Bad City Blue featuring Button Men in 2000 AD #468-479.

== Premise ==
Harry Exton, an ex-soldier, is a "Button Man", a hired killer pitted against others in an underground sport. Each works for a mysterious "Voice", a rich man of unknown identity. The object of the game is to defeat one's opponents, and take their marker – the first two joints of a finger. Button Men who lose three fingers are executed. While killing an opponent is generally acceptable, it is not always the preferred outcome of a match - on one occasion Exton's Voice loses a wager when Exton kills his opponent rather than taking his marker, thus beginning the souring of the relationship between Exton and his Voice. The Voices profit from the game by gambling on the outcome, and a ruthless killer such as Harry Exton can make a modestly wealthy man extremely rich. The Button Men themselves are paid well for their tasks.

Despite being exceptionally good at the sport and not losing any markers during his involvement, Exton decides to quit, and tracks down his Voice killing him, thinking that will remove him from the sport. This grants him temporary freedom and he settles down anonymously in a small town, even starting an affair with a local waitress. He is himself tracked down by other Button Men (and a Button Woman) whose Voices view Exton as the ultimate sport due to his previous unparalleled success. Exton has advance warning of their presence when he spots them disguised as tourists in the Diner his girlfriend works at, and notices that one is missing two markers. Exton kills all the other operatives apart from one with whom he makes a deal - he cuts off his own finger and gives it to the surviving Button Man before dropping a tracking device (inserted into a filling by the jealous husband) into a lake. This convinces the Voices that Exton is dead, and the hunt is called off. Later Exton reneges on his deal and kills the final Button Man to ensure that there are no loose ends.

== Publication ==
Button Man ran for four series. The series outings, all written by John Wagner, are:

- Button Man:
  - "Book I: The Killing Game" (with Arthur Ranson, in 2000 AD #780-791, 1992)
  - "Book II: The Confession of Harry Exton" (with Arthur Ranson, in 2000 AD #904-919, 1994)
  - "Book III: Killer Killer" (with Arthur Ranson, in 2000 AD prog 2001 & #1223-1233, 2001)
  - "Book IV: The Hitman's Daughter" (with Frazer Irving, in 2000 AD #1551-1566, 2007)

=== Collected editions ===
The stories are being collected into trade paperbacks:

Description	Collecting
The Killing Game (88 pages, Kitchen Sink Press, May 1994, ISBN 0-87816-276-3, Rebellion Developments, hardcover, August 2003, ISBN 1-904265-05-7, softcover, January 2007, ISBN 1-905437-19-6)	Book I
The Confession of Harry Exton (112 pages, Rebellion, August 2003, ISBN 1-905437-70-6)	Book II
Killer Killer (96 pages, Rebellion, June 2009, ISBN 1-906735-09-3)	Book III
The Hitman's Daughter (96 pages, Rebellion, 2010, ISBN 978-1-906735-42-5)	Book IV
Get Harry Ex (304 pages, Rebellion, September 2013, ISBN 978-1-781081-38-9)	Books I-III

== Awards ==
- 2000: Nominated for the Eagle Award for "Character Most Worthy of Own Ongoing Title"

== Adaptation ==
In an interview with the Class of '79 fanzine, John Wagner said the original movie option rights were negotiated by the book's original US publisher, Kitchen Sink.

For some years, the film rights were owned by DreamWorks, which co-opted the producers of Wagner's A History of Violence. The film was initially rumoured to be planned for release in 2008. In late May 2012, Deadline Hollywood reported that Nicolas Winding Refn was in talks with DreamWorks about directing.

In March 2019, Netflix announced that they had hired Brian Helgeland to write and direct an adaptation of Button Man as a feature-length film. In April 2021 artist Arthur Ranson confirmed the project had again been shelved.

A television adaptation was put into development in May 2024.
