= Pat Mills bibliography =

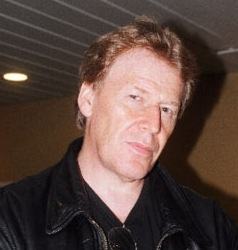
- Active period: 1970s–present

Publishers

Pat Mills has written comics since the early seventies.

As well as his influential role in creating and contributing to numerous of British comics, Mills has produced work in both America and Europe. In particular he is known for creating 2000 AD where he was the first editor and contributed to a number of long-running stories like ABC Warriors which has run for nearly thirty years. He was also responsible for creating The Butterfly Children series of books for children with his former wife, Angela Kincaid.

== Comics ==
=== 2000 AD ===
Comics work on 2000 AD and related titles (both Tornado and Starlord were merged into 2000 AD and some of the stories continued there) include:

- M.A.C.H.1:
  - "Vulcan" (with Enio, in 2000 AD No. 1, 1977)
  - "The Final Encounter " (with Montero, in 2000 AD #61–64, 1978)
- Invasion! (in 2000 AD #1–51, 1977–1978, included in Invasion!, March 2007, ISBN 1-905437-26-9)
- Flesh (tpb, 176 pages, Rebellion Developments, August 2009, ISBN 1-906735-11-5) collects:
  - "Flesh Book 1" (with Boix (1), Felix Carrion (18) and Ramon Sola (19) in 2000 AD No. 1, 18–19, 1977)
  - "Legend of Shamana Book 1" (with co-writer Tony Skinner and art by Carl Critchlow, in 2000 AD #800–808, 1992)
  - "Legend of Shamana Book 2" (with co-writer Tony Skinner and art by Carl Critchlow, in 2000 AD #817–825, 1993)
  - "Flesh: Texas" (with James Mackay, in 2000 AD #1724–1733, 2011)
  - "Flesh: Midnight Cowboys" (with James Mackay, in 2000 AD #1774–1785, 2012)
  - "Flesh: Badlanders" (with James Mackay, in 2000 AD #1850-1861, 2013)
- Dan Dare:
  - "Dan Dare" (with co-author Ken Armstrong and art by Massimo Belardinelli, in 2000 AD No. 1, 1977)
  - "Return of the Mekon" (with co-authors John Wagner and B. J. Tomlinson, in Eagle #1–33, 1982)
  - "The Dare Report" (with Ian Kennedy, in Eagle #34–38, 1982)
  - "Fireflight" (with Ian Kennedy, in Eagle #39–83, 1982–1983)
- Shako! (with co-author John Wagner and various artists, in 2000 AD #20–23, 1977)
- Judge Dredd:
  - "The Neon Knights" (with Ian Gibson, in 2000 AD No. 29, 1977)
  - "The Return of Rico" (with Mike McMahon, in 2000 AD No. 30, 1977)
  - "The Cursed Earth" (with Brian Bolland and Mike McMahon, in 2000 AD #61–70, 81–85, 1978)
  - "The Blood of Satanus" (with Ron Smith, in 2000 AD #152–154, 1980)
  - "Flashback 2099: The Return of Rico" (with Paul Johnson, in 2000 AD #950–952, 1995)
  - "Hammerstein" (with co-author Tony Skinner, and art by Jason Brashill, in 2000 AD #960–963, 1995)
  - "Blood of Satanus II" (with Duke Mighten, in Judge Dredd Megazine #214–217, 2004)
  - "Blood of Satanus III" (with John Hicklenton, in Judge Dredd Megazine #257–265, 2007)
  - "Steamers" (with Smudge, in 2000 AD 1609, 2008)
  - "Birthday Boy" (with Vince Locke, in 2000 AD #1613–1616, 2008)
- The Visible Man (with Carlos Trigo (47–48) and Montero (49–52), in 2000 AD #47–52, 1978)
- Ro-Busters (collected in The Complete Ro-Busters, 336 pages, Rebellion, November 2008, ISBN 1-905437-82-X):
  - "The North Sea Tunnel" (with Carlos Pino, in Starlord No. 1, 1978)
  - "The Preying Mantis" (with various artists, in Starlord #2–4, 1978)
  - "The Ritz Space Hotel" (with various artists, in Starlord #7–12, 1978)
  - "Death on the Orient Express" (with Dave Gibbons, in 2000 AD #86–87, 1978)
  - "Hammerstein's War Memoirs" (with various artists, in 2000 AD #88–92, 1978)
  - "Ro-Jaws Memoirs" (with Mike Dorey, in 2000 AD #93–97, 1978–1979)
  - "The Terra-Meks" (with Dave Gibbons, in 2000 AD #98–101, 1979)
  - "Fall & Rise of Ro-Jaws and Hammerstein" (with Kevin O'Neill and Mike McMahon, in 2000 AD #103–115, 1979)
- Planet of the Damned (with various artists, in Starlord #1–10, 1978)
- Wagner's Walk (in Tornado #1–7 & 10–19, 1979)
- ABC Warriors:
  - "ABC Warriors" (with Kevin O'Neill, in 2000 AD No. 119, 1979)
  - "The Retreat from Volgow" (with Kevin O'Neill, in 2000 AD No. 120, 1979)
  - "Mongrol" (with Mike McMahon, in 2000 AD #121–122, 1979)
  - "The Order of Knights Martial" (with Brendan McCarthy, in 2000 AD #123–124, 1979)
  - "The Bougainville Massacre" (with Mike McMahon, in 2000 AD #125–126, 1979)
  - "Steelhorn" (with Brendan McCarthy, in 2000 AD #127–128, 1979)
  - "Mars, the Devil Planet" (with Brendan McCarthy, in 2000 AD No. 129, 1979)
  - "Cyboons" (with Dave Gibbons, in 2000 AD #130–131, 1979)
  - "The Red Death" (with Mike McMahon, in 2000 AD #132–133, 1979)
  - "Golgatha" (with Carlos Ezquerra, in 2000 AD #134–136, 1979)
  - "Mad George" (with Mike McMahon, in 2000 AD #137–139, 1979)
  - "Volgo the Ultimate Death Machine" (with Steve Dillon, in Diceman No. 2, 1986)
  - "The Black Hole" (with Simon Bisley (1–4, 9–12, 17–21) and SMS (5–8, 13–16), in 2000 AD #555–566 & 573–581, 1988)
  - "Khronicles of Khaos Book I" (with Kev Walker, in 2000 AD #750–757, 1991)
  - "Khronicles of Khaos Book II" (with Kev Walker, in 2000 AD #780-84 & 787–790, 1992)
  - "Dishonourable Discharge" (with Kev Walker, in 2000 AD Winter Special No. 4, 1992)
  - "Hellbringer Book I" (with Kev Walker, in 2000 AD #904–911, 1994)
  - "Hammerstein" (with Jason Brashill, in 2000 AD #960–963)
  - "Hellbringer Book II" (with Kev Walker, in 2000 AD #964–971, 1995)
  - "Joe Pineapples – His Greatest Hits" (with Tom Carney, in 2000 AD 1996 Sci-Fi Special)
  - "Roadkill" (with Kev Walker, in 2000 AD prog 2000, 1999)
  - "The Third Element " (with Henry Flint, in 2000 AD #1234–1236, 2001)
  - "The Clone Cowboys" (with Liam Sharp, in 2000 AD #1237–1239, 2001)
  - "The Tripods" (with Mike McMahon, in 2000 AD #1240–1242, 2001)
  - "The Zero Option" (with Boo Cook, in 2000 AD #1243–1245, 2001)
  - "Assault on the Red House" (with Henry Flint, in 2000 AD #1236–1248, 2001)
  - "The Shadow Warriors Book I" (with Carlos Ezquerra, in 2000 AD #1336–1341, 2003)
  - "The Shadow Warriors Book II" (with Henry Flint, in 2000 AD #1400–1405, 2004)
  - "The Shadow Warriors Book III" (with Henry Flint, in 2000 AD #1476–1485, 2006)
  - "The Volgan War Volume 1" (with Clint Langley, in 2000 AD #1518–1525, 2007)
  - "The Volgan War Volume 2" (with Clint Langley, in 2000 AD #1550–1559, 2007)
  - "The Volgan War Volume 3" (with Clint Langley, in 2000 AD #1601–1606, 1611–1616, 2008)
  - "The Volgan War Volume 4" (with Clint Langley, in 2000 AD #1666–1677, 2010)
  - "Return to Earth" (with Clint Langley, in 2000 AD #1800–1811, 2012)
  - "Return to Mars" (with Clint Langley, in 2000 AD #1862–1873, 2014)
  - "Return to Ro-busters" (with Clint Langley, in 2000 AD #1961-1972, 2016)
  - "Fallout" (with Clint Langley, in 2000 AD #2061-2072, 2018)
- Ro-Jaws' Robo-Tales: "The Inside Story" (with Kevin O'Neill, in 2000 AD No. 144, 1979)
- Nemesis the Warlock:
  - "Terror Tube" (with Kevin O'Neill, in 2000 AD No. 167, 1980)
  - "Killer Watt" (with Kevin O'Neill, in 2000 AD #178–179, 1980)
  - "The Sword Sinister" (with Kevin O'Neill, in 1981 Sci-Fi Special)
  - "The World of Termight (Book I)" (with Kevin O'Neill, in 2000 AD #222–244, 1981)
  - "The Alien Alliance" (Book II) (with Jesus Redondo, in 2000 AD #246–257, 1982)
  - "The Secret Life of the Blitzspear" (with Kevin O'Neill, in 2000 AD Annual 1983, 1982)
  - "The World of Nemesis (Book III)" (with Kevin O'Neill, in 2000 AD #335–349, 1983)
  - "A Day in the Death of Torquemada" (with Kevin O'Neill, in 2000 AD Annual 1984, 1983)
  - "The Secret Life of the Blitzspear" (with Kevin O'Neill, in 2000 AD Annual 1984, 1983)
  - "The Gothic Empire (Book IV)" (with Kevin O'Neill (1–2) and Bryan Talbot (3–20), in 2000 AD #387–388, 1984)
  - "Ego Trip" (with Kevin O'Neill, in 2000 AD No. 430, 1985)
  - "Vengeance of Thoth (Book V)" (with Bryan Talbot, in 2000 AD #435–445, 1985)
  - "The Torture Tube" (with Kevin O'Neill, in Dice Man No. 1, 1986)
  - "Torquemurder (Book VI) Part 1" (with Bryan Talbot, in 2000 AD #482–487, 1986)
  - "Torquemurder (Book VI) Part 2" (with Bryan Talbot, in 2000 AD #500–504, 1986–1987)
  - "Torquemada the God" (with Kevin O'Neill, in 2000 AD #520–524, 1987)
  - "A Bedtime Story" photostory (photography by Tony Luke, with Christine Gravel, Keith Banks and Lef Fuller, in 2000 AD No. 534, 1987)
  - "The Two Torquemadas (Book VII)" (with John Hicklenton, in 2000 AD #546–557, 1987–1988)
  - "Purity's Story (Book VIII)" (with David Roach, in 2000 AD #558-566,1988)
  - "Deathbringer (Book IX)" (with John Hicklenton, in 2000 AD #586–593 and #605–608, 1988–1989)
  - "The Tomb of Torquemada" (with Kevin O'Neill, in Poster Prog Nemesis No. 1, 1994)
  - "Shapes of things to come" (with Paul Staples, in 2000 AD #824)
  - "The Hammer of Warlocks" (with Clint Langley, in 2000 AD #901–903)
  - "Book X: The Final Conflict" (with Kevin O'Neill, in 2000 AD Prog 2000, 1999)
  - "Tubular Hells" (with Kevin O’Neill, in 2000 AD #2000, 2017)
- Sláine:
  - Warrior's Dawn (2005, Rebellion, ISBN 1-904265-33-2):
    - "The Time Monster" (with Angela Kincaid, in 2000 AD No. 330, 1983)
    - "The Beast in the Broch" (with Massimo Belardinelli, in 2000 AD #331–334, 1983)
    - "Warrior's Dawn" (with Mike McMahon, in 2000 AD No. 335, 1983)
    - "The Beltain Giant" (with Mike McMahon, in 2000 AD No. 336, 1983).
    - "The Bride of Crom" (with Massimo Belardinelli, in 2000 AD #337–342, 1983).
    - "The Creeping Death" (with Massimo Belardinelli, in 2000 AD No. 343, 1983).
    - "The Bull Dance" (with Massimo Belardinelli, in 2000 AD No. 344, 1983).
    - "Heroes' Blood" (with Mike McMahon, in 2000 AD #345–347, 1983)
    - "The Shoggey Beast" (with Mike McMahon, in 2000 AD #348–351, 1983–1984)
    - "Sky Chariots" (with Mike McMahon, in 2000 AD #352–360, 1984)
    - "The Origins" (two-page text article, in 2000 AD No. 352, 1984)
  - Time Killer (2007, Rebellion, ISBN 1-905437-21-8):
    - "Dragonheist" (with Massimo Belardinelli, in 2000 AD #361–367, 1984)
    - "The Time Killer" (with Glenn Fabry, David Pugh and Bryan Talbot, in 2000 AD #411–428 and 431–434, 1985)
  - The Sláine Gaming Book (1986, Titan Books, ISBN 0-907610-73-0):
    - "You are Slàine in: Cauldron of Blood" (with David Lloyd, Dice Man No. 1, 1986, see also Rebellion's 2010 paperback "Demon Killer")
    - "You are Sláine in: the Dragon Corpse" (with Nik Williams, Dice Man No. 2, 1986)
    - "You are Sláine in: the Ring of Danu" (with Mike Collins, Dice Man No. 4, 1986)
  - The King (2008, Rebellion, ISBN 978-1-905437-66-5)
    - "The Tomb of Terror" (with Glenn Fabry and David Pugh, in 2000 AD #447–461, December 1985 – March 1986)
    - "You are Sláine in The Tomb of Terror" (role playing game, with Gary Leach, Glenn Fabry, Williams and Una Fricker, 2000 AD #447–461, 1985–1986)
    - "Spoils of Annwn" (with Mike Collins and Mark Farmer, in 2000 AD #493–499, October–December 1986)
    - "Sláine the King" (with Glenn Fabry, in 2000 AD #500–508 and #517–519, December 1986 – April 1987)
    - "The Killing Field" (with Angie Kincaid, with Glen Fabry, in 2000AD No. 582, July 1988)
    - "Slaine the Mini-Series" (with Glenn Fabry, in 2000 AD #589–591, August–September 1988)
  - The Horned God (with Simon Bisley, 2009, Rebellion, ISBN 978-1-905437-73-3)
    - "The Horned God, Book I" (in 2000 AD #626–635, May–July 1989)
    - "The Horned God, Book II" (in 2000 AD #650–656 and #662–664, October 1989 – February 1990)
    - "The Horned God, Book III" (in 2000 AD #688–698, July–September 1990)
  - Demon Killer (2010, Rebellion, ISBN 978-1-906735-41-8)
    - "The High King" (with Glen Fabry, 2000AD Yearbook, September 1991)
    - "Jealousy of Niamh" (with Greg Staples and Nick Percival in 2000 AD #850–851, August–September 1993)
    - "Demon Killer" (with Glenn Fabry and Dermot Power, in 2000 AD #852–859, September–October 1993)
    - "Queen of Witches" (with Dermot Power, in 2000 AD #889–896, May–July 1994)
    - "The Return of the High King" (with Dermot Power, 2000 AD Poster Prog Sláine 1, 1993)
    - "Cauldron of Blood" (role playing game, with David Lloyd, Dice Man No. 1, 1986)
  - Lord of Misrule (2011, Rebellion, ISBN 978-1-907519-85-7)
    - "Name of the Sword" (with Greg Staples, in 2000 AD #950–956, July–September 1995)
    - "Lord of Misrule, Part I" (with Clint Langley, in 2000 AD #958–963, September–October 1995, digitally re painted by Clint Langley)
    - "Lord of Misrule, Part II" (with Clint Langley, in 2000 AD #995–998, June 1996, digitally re painted by Clint Langley)
    - "Bowels of Hell" (with Jim Murray, in 2000 AD #1000, July 1996)
  - Treasures of Britain (2012, Rebellion, ISBN 1-907992-97-9):
    - "Treasures of Britain" (with Dermot Power, in 2000 AD #1001–1010, July–September 1996, #1024–1031, January–February 1997)
    - "The Cloak of Fear" (with Steve Tappin, in 2000 AD #1011–1012, October 1996)
  - The Grail War (2013, Rebellion ISBN 1781081123):
    - "The Demon Hitchhiker" (with Steve Tappin, in 2000 AD #1032, March 1997)
    - "King of Hearts" (with Nick Percival, in 2000 AD #1033–1039, March–April 1997)
    - "The Grail War" (with Steve Tappin, in 2000 AD #1040–1049, April–July 1997)
    - "Secret of the Grail" (with Steve Tappin, in 2000 AD #1090–1099, April–June 1998)
    - "The Battle of Clontarf" (with Massimo Belardinelli, in 2000 AD Annual, 1985)
  - Lord of the Beasts, Rebellion (2014):
    - "Lord of the Beasts" (with Rafael Garres, in 2000 AD #1100, June 1998)
    - "Kai" (with Paul Staples, in 2000 AD #1104–1107, July–August 1998)
    - "The Banishing" (with Wayne Reynolds, in 2000 AD #1108–1109, August 1998)
    - "The Triple Death" (with Wayne Reynolds, in 2000 AD #1111, September 1998)
    - "The Swan Children" (with Siku, in 2000 AD #1112–1114, September–October 1998)
    - "Macha" (with Paul Staples, in 2000 AD #1115–1118, October–November 1998)
    - "Beyond" (with Greg Staples, in 2000 AD Prog 2000, December 1999)
    - "The Secret Commonwealth" (with David Bircham, in 2000 AD #1183–1199, March–June 2000)
    - "The Arrow of God" (with Steve Parkhouse, in 2000 AD Annual, 1989)
  - The Books of Invasions: Moloch and Golamh (2006, Rebellion, ISBN 1-904265-82-0):
    - "The Books of Invasions I: Moloch" (in 2000 AD Prog 2003 and #1322–1326, December 2002 – February 2003)
    - "The Books of Invasions II: Golamh" (in 2000 AD #1350–1355, July–August 2003)
  - The Books of Invasions: Scota and Tara (2006, Rebellion, ISBN 1-904265-92-8):
    - "The Books of Invasions III: Scota" (in 2000 AD Prog 2004 and #1371–1376, December 2003 – February 2004)
    - "The Books of Invasions IV: Tara" (in 2000 AD Prog 2005 and #1420–1425, December 2004 – February 2005)
  - The Books of Invasions: Odacon (July 2007, Rebellion, ISBN 1-904265-92-8):
    - "The Books of Invasions V: Odacon" (in 2000 AD #1436–1442, April–June 2005)
    - "Carnival" (in 2000 AD Prog 2006 and #1469–1475, December 2005 – February 2006)
  - Slaine the Wanderer (2011, Rebellion, ISBN 978-1-907992-24-7):
    - "The Gong Beater" (with Clint Langley, in 2000 AD #1635–1638, May–June 2009)
    - "The Amber Smuggler" (with Clint Langley, in 2000 AD #1662–1665, November–December 2009)
    - "The Exorcist" (with Clint Langley, in 2000 AD, #1709–1712, November 2010)
    - "The Mercenary" (with Clint Langley, in 2000 AD, #1713–1714 and Prog 2011, November–December 2010)
  - The Book of Scars (2013, Rebellion, ISBN 978-1781081761):
    - "The Book of Scars" (with Clint Langley, Mike McMahon, Glenn Fabry, Simon Bisley, in 2000 AD, #1844-1849, August 2013)
  - The Brutania Chronicles: A Simple Killing (2015, Rebellion, ISBN 978-1781083352):
    - "The Brutania Chronicles: A Simple Killing" (with Simon Davis, in 2000 AD, #1874–1886, 2014)
  - The Brutania Chronicles: Primordial (2016, Rebellion, ISBN 978-1781084724):
    - "The Brutania Chronicles: Primordial" (with Simon Davis, in 2000 AD, #1924–1936, 2015)
  - The Brutania Chronicles: Psychopomp (2017, Rebellion, ISBN 978-1781085462):
    - "The Brutania Chronicles: Psychopomp" (with Simon Davis, in 2000 AD, #1979-1988, 2016)
    - "Red Branch" (with Simon Davis, in 2000 AD 40th Anniversary Special, 2017)
  - The Brutania Chronicles: Archon (2018, Rebellion, ISBN 978-1781086322):
    - "The Brutania Chronicles: Archon" (with Simon Davis, in 2000 AD, #2050–2060, 2017)
  - Uncollected:
    - "The Devil's Banquet" (with Glen Fabry, in 2000 AD Sci Fi Special 1986), a one-page preview for the story "The King", completely re-drawn on two pages in 2000 AD #503.
    - "The Bogatyr" (with Chris Weston, in 2000 AD #2111, 2018)
    - "Dragontamer" (with Leonardo Manco, in 2000 AD #2212–ongoing, 2020–2021)
- Torquemada:
  - "The Garden of Alien Delights" (with Bryan Talbot, in Diceman No. 3, 1986)
  - "Torquemada the God" (with Kevin O'Neill, in 2000 AD #520–524, 1987)
  - "Torquemada's Second Honeymoon" (with Kevin O'Neill, in 2000 AD Annual 1988, 1987)
- Diceman:
  - "In The Bronx, No-one Can Hear You Scream!" (with Graham Manley, in Diceman No. 2, 1986)
  - "Dark Powers" (with John Ridgway, in Diceman No. 3, 1986)
  - "Bitter Streets" (with Steve Dillon, in Diceman No. 4, 1986)
  - "Murder One" (with Steve Dillon, in Diceman No. 4, 1986)
- Rogue Trooper:
  - "Killothon" (with Steve Dillon, in Diceman No. 3, 1986)
- You Are Ronald Reagan! in:
  - "Twilight's Last Gleaming!" (with Hunt Emerson, in Diceman No. 5, 1986)
- Nemesis & Deadlock (with Carl Critchlow):
  - "Warlocks and Wizards" (in 2000 AD No. 700, 1990)
  - "Enigmass Variations" (in 2000 AD #723–729, 1991)
- Finn:
  - "Finn Book 1" (with co-writer Tony Skinner, with art by Jim Elston (1–10) and Kevin Wicks (5–10), in 2000 AD #770–779, 1992)
  - "Finn Book 2" (with co-writer Tony Skinner and Jim Elston/Kevin Wicks, in 2000 AD#807-#816, 1992–1993)
  - "Origins of Finn" (with Liam McCormack-Sharp, in 2000 AD #924–927, 1995)
  - "Interventions" (with Paul Staples, in 2000 AD #928–949, 1995)
  - "Season of the Witch" (with Paul Staples, in 2000 AD #991–999, 1996)
- Dinosty (with Clint Langley, in 2000 AD #873–882, 1994)
- Vector 13: "Case Ten: Video Nasty" (with John Ridgway, in 2000 AD No. 997, 1996)
- Deadlock (with Henry Flint, in 2000 AD #1212–1222, 2000)
- Black Siddha (with Simon Davis):
  - "Bad Karma" (in Judge Dredd Megazine #202–208, 2003)
  - "Kali Yuga" (in Judge Dredd Megazine #218–223, 2004)
  - "Return of the Jester" (in Judge Dredd Megazine #245–252, 2006)
- Whatever Happened To?: "Tweak" (with pencils by Chris Weston and inks by Garry Leach, in Judge Dredd Megazine No. 214, 2004)
- Savage:
  - The Complete Savage: Volume 1: (June 2007, ISBN 1-905437-28-5) collects:
    - "Savage Book I" (with Charlie Adlard, in 2000 AD #1387–1396, 2004)
    - "Savage Book II" (with Charlie Adlard, in 2000 AD #1450–1459, 2005)
    - "Savage Book III" (with Charlie Adlard, in 2000 AD #1526–1535, 2007)
  - "Book IV: The Guv'nor" (with Patrick Goddard, in 2000 AD #1577–1586, 2008)
  - "Book V: 1984" (with Patrick Goddard, in 2000 AD #1632–1641, 2009)
  - "Book VI: Crims" (with Patrick Goddard, in 2000 AD #1685–1699, 2010)
  - "Book VII: Secret City" (with Patrick Goddard, in 2000 AD #1740–1749, 2011)
  - "Book 8: Rise Like Lions" (with Patrick Goddard, in 2000 AD #2013, 1813–1823, 2013)
  - "Book 9: Grinders" (with Patrick Goddard, in 2000 AD Prog 2015, #1912-1913, 2015)
  - "Book 10: The Märze Murderer" (with Patrick Goddard, in 2000 AD #2001-2010, 2017)
  - "Book 11: The Thousand-Year Stare" (with Patrick Goddard, in 2000 AD #2061-ongoing, 2018)
- Greysuit (with John Higgins:
  - "Project Monarch" (in 2000 AD #1540–1549, 2007)
  - "The Old Man of the Mountains" (in 2000 AD Prog 2009 and #1617–1624, 2008–2009)
  - "Prince of Darkness" (in 2000 AD #1901-1911, 2014)
  - "Foul Play" (in 2000 AD #2040-2049, 2017)
- Defoe (with Leigh Gallagher):
  - Defoe: 1666 (128 pages, August 2009, ISBN 1-906735-10-7) collects:
    - "1666" (in 2000 AD #1540–1549, 2007)
    - "Brethren of the Night" (in 2000 AD #1589–1598, 2008)
  - Queen of the Zombies (ISBN 1-907992-47-2) collects:
    - "Queen of the Zombies" (#1640–1649, 2009)
    - "A Murder of Angels" (#1700–1709, 2010)
  - "The Damned" (#1836–1847, 2013)
  - "The London Hanged" (#1950-1960, 2015)
  - "Diehards" (#2026-39, 2017)
- Joe Pineapples:
  - "Tin Man" (with Simon Bisley and Clint Langley, in 2000 AD #2312–2322, 2022–2023)

=== Other British comics ===
Stories for British comics other than 2000 AD include:

- They Can't Stop Bullet (in Battle Weekly, 1975)
- Hook Jaw (creator, co-writer Ken Armstrong, artist Ramon Sola, in Action, 1976, partly collected by Spitfire Comics in Hook Jaw vol. 1, 104 pages, 2007, ISBN 0-9554733-0-6)
- Charley's War (with Joe Colquhoun, in Battle, January 1979 to October 1985) collected as:
  - 2 June – 1 August 1916 (November 2004, ISBN 1-84023-627-2)
  - 1 August – 17 October 1916 (November 2005, ISBN 1-84023-929-8)
  - 17 October 1916 – 21 February 1917 (October 2006, ISBN 1-84576-270-3)
  - Blue's Story (October 2007, ISBN 1-84576-323-8)
  - Return to the Front (October 2008, ISBN 1-84576-796-9)
  - Underground and Over the Top (October 2009, ISBN 1-84576-797-7)
  - The Great Mutiny (October 2010, ISBN 978-1848567412)
  - Hitler's Youth (October 2011, ISBN 978-0857682994)
  - Death From Above (October 2012, ISBN 978-0857683007)
  - The End (To be released: October 2013, ISBN 978-0857683014)
- Doctor Who (with co-writer John Wagner and art by Dave Gibbons, in Doctor Who Magazine #1–16 & 19–34, Marvel UK, 1979–80, collected in The Iron Legion, Panini Comics, 2004, ISBN 1-904159-37-0):
  - "The Iron Legion" (#1–8)
  - "City of the Damned" (#9–16)
  - "The Star Beast" (#19–26)
  - "Dogs of Doom" (#27–34)
- You Are Maggie Thatcher: A Dole-Playing Game, with Hunt Emerson, Titan Books, 1987)
- Third World War:
  - Book I:
    - "Hamburger Lady" (with Carlos Ezquerra, in Crisis #1–2, 1988)
    - "Coola Cola Kid" (with Carlos Ezquerra, in Crisis #3–4, 1988)
    - "The Killing Yields" (with Carlos Ezquerra, in Crisis #5–6, 1988)
    - "Blood Money" (with D'Israeli (1) and Angela Kincaid (2), in Crisis #7–8, 1988)
    - "Danse Macabre" (with Carlos Ezquerra, in Crisis #9–10, 1989)
    - "Made of Maize" (with Carlos Ezquerra, in Crisis #11–12, 1989)
    - "Sell out" (with Carlos Ezquerra, in Crisis #13–14, 1989)
  - Book II:
    - "Here Be Dragons" (with co-author Alan Mitchell and art by Angela Kincaid (1) and John Hicklenton (2), in Crisis #15–16, 1989)
    - "Back in Babylon" (with co-author Alan Mitchell and art by Carlos Ezquerra, in Crisis #17–18, 1989)
    - "Liat's Law" (with co-author Alan Mitchell and art by Duncan Fegredo, in Crisis #19, 1989)
    - "All About Eve" (with co-author Alan Mitchell and art by Carlos Ezquerra, in Crisis #20–21, 1989)
    - "Symphony of Splintered Wood" (with co-author Malachy Coney and art by Sean Phillips, in Crisis #22–23, 1989)
    - "Remembering Zion" (with co-author Alan Mitchell and art by Sean Phillips, in Crisis #24, 1989)
    - "The World According to Ryan" (with co-author Alan Mitchell and art by John Hicklenton, in Crisis #25, 1989)
    - "Liat's Law II" (with co-author Alan Mitchell and art by Duncan Fegredo, in Crisis #26, 1989)
    - "Book of Babylon" (with co-author Alan Mitchell and art by Sean Phillips, in Crisis #27, 1989)
    - "The Dark Other" (with co-author Alan Mitchell and art by John Hicklenton, in Crisis #29, 1989)
    - "The Rhythm of Resistance" (with co-author Alan Mitchell and art by John Hicklenton, in Crisis #30, 1989)
    - "The Calling" (with co-author Alan Mitchell and art by Sean Phillips, in Crisis #31, 1989)
    - "The Man With the Child in His Eyes" (with co-author Alan Mitchell and art by Sean Phillips, in Crisis #33–34, 1989)
    - "Black Man's Burden" (with co-author Alan Mitchell and art by John Hicklenton, in Crisis #35, 1990)
    - "Ivan's Story: Why Me?" part 1 (with co-author Alan Mitchell and art by Steve Pugh, in Crisis, #36, 1990)
    - "Too Late The Hero" (with co-author Alan Mitchell and art by Robert Blackwell, in Crisis #37, 1990)
    - "Epilogue: Baiting the Dragon" (with co-author Alan Mitchell and art by Richard Piers-Rayner & Tim Perkins, in Crisis #38, 1990)
  - Book III: The Big Heat:
    - "Rebels With a Cause" (with co-author Alan Mitchell and art by Glyn Dillon, in Crisis #40–41, 1990)
    - "Killing Us Softly" (with co-author Alan Mitchell and art by Glyn Dillon, in Crisis, #43–44, 1990)
    - "Sinergy" (with co-author Alan Mitchell and art by Rob Blackwell, in Crisis #45–46, 1990)
    - "Dollarology" (with co-author Alan Mitchell and art by Rob Blackwell, in Crisis #47–48, 1990)
  - Book IV:
    - "Ivan's Story: Why Me?" parts 2 to 4 (with co-author Alan Mitchell and art by Steve Pugh, in Crisis #49–51, 1990)
    - "The Final Problem" (with co-author Alan Mitchell and art by John Hicklenton, in Crisis #53, 1990)
- "The Death Factory" (art by Sean Phillips, in Crisis #39, 1990)
- "A Kind of Madness" (art by Sean Phillips, in Crisis #39, 1990)
- Accident Man (with co-writer Tony Skinner):
  - "Accident Man" (with Martin Emond, in Toxic! #1–6, 1991)
  - "The Death Touch" (with Duke Mighten, in Toxic! #10–16, 1991)
  - "The Messiah Sting" (with John Erusmus, in Toxic! #17–21, 1991)
  - "Accident Man" (3-issues mini-series with Duke Mighten, Dark Horse, 1993)
- The Redeemer (with co-author Debbie Gallagher and art by Wayne Reynolds, Black Library, in Warhammer Monthly No. 16 (prelude), 18, 20, 22, 1999, tpb, 96 pages, 2000, ISBN 1-84154-120-6, tpb with 8-page bonus strip by Andy Jones, 104 pages, 2003, ISBN 1-84154-274-1)
- Brats Bizarre (with co-author Tony Skinner, art by Duke Mighten, in Toxic! #23–26, 1991; continued as 4-issue mini-series, Epic Comics, 1994)
- "The Ayatollah's Son: STARS" (with Lee O'Connor, in Ctrl.Alt.Shift Unmasks Corruption, 2009)
- American Reaper (art by Clint Langley, in Judge Dredd Megazine #316–321, 2011–2012)
- American Reaper II (art by Clint Langley, in Judge Dredd Megazine #332-337, 2013)
- American Reaper III (art by Clint Langley, in Judge Dredd Megazine #355-360, 2014–2015)
- "Ragtime Soldier" (art by Gary Welsh and Philip Vaughan, in Great War Dundee #1, 2019)

=== American comics ===
Work for the American comics publishers include:

- Metalzoic (with Kevin O'Neill, DC Graphic Novel, 1986)
- Marshal Law (with Kevin O'Neill):
  - Marshal Law (#1–6, Epic Comics, August 1987– February 1989)
  - Crime & Punishment, Marshal Law Takes Manhattan (Epic Comics, 1989)
  - Fear and Loathing (collects Marshal Law #1-6, with an 8 pages new prologue, Epic Comics, 1990, ISBN 0-87135-676-7, Titan, 2002, ISBN 1-84023-452-0)
  - Kingdom of the Blind (Apocalypse, 1990, ISBN 1-873323-00-X)
  - The Hateful Dead (Apocalypse, 1991)
  - Super Babylon (Dark Horse, 1992)
  - Blood Sweat and Tears (collects Kingdom of the Blind, The Hateful Dead, and Super Babylon, Dark Horse, 1993, ISBN 1-878574-95-7, Titan, 2003, ISBN 1-84023-526-8).
  - Pinhead vs Marshal Law : Law in Hell (#1 & 2, Epic Comics, 1993)
  - Secret Tribunal (#1 & 2, Dark Horse, 1993)
  - The Savage Dragon/Marshal Law (#1 & 2, b&w, Image Comics, 1997)
  - The Mask/Marshal Law (#1 & 2, Dark Horse, 1998)
  - Fear Asylum (collects Takes Manhattan, Secret Tribunal, and vs The Mask, Titan Books, 2003, ISBN 1-84023-699-X)
  - The Day of the Dead (an illustrated novella, Titan Books, 2004, ISBN 1-84023-636-1)
  - Cloak of Evil (an illustrated novella, Titan Books, 2006, ISBN 1-84023-683-3, scheduled but not published)
- Sex Warrior (with co-author Tony Skinner, pencils by Mike McKone and inks by John Erasmus, reprinted as 2-issue mini-series, Dark Horse Comics, 1993)
- Ravage 2099 #8–32 (with co-authors Stan Lee and Tony Skinner, Marvel Comics, 1993–1995)
- Punisher 2099 #1–29 (with co-writer Tony Skinner, Marvel Comics, 1993–1995)
- Punisher Summer Special No. 2 & 3 (Marvel Comics, 1993, 1994)
- Doom 2099 No. 25 (fill in "Public Enemy", with co-writer Tony Skinner, Marvel Comics, 1995)
- Morbius, the Living Vampire No. 24 (with co-author Tony Skinner, pencils by Nick J Napolitano and inks by Ralph Cabrera, Marvel Comics, 1994)
- Death Race 2020 #1–8 (with co-writer Tony Skinner, Kevin O'Neill artist for #1–3, Trevor Goring #4–8, Roger Corman's Cosmic Comics, 1995)
- ZombieWorld: "Tree of Death" (with John Hicklenton, Dark Horse, 4-issue mini-series, 1999, collected in ZombieWorld: Winter's Dregs, 2005 ISBN 1-59307-384-4)
- Batman: Book of Shadows (with co-author Debbie Gallagher and art by Duke Mightem, 64 pages, prestige format, DC Comics, 1999)
- Star Wars #23–26 : "Infinity's End" (with Ramon F. Bachs, Dark Horse Comics, 2000)

=== French comics ===
Work on French-language comics (some of which has subsequently been serialised and collected by Heavy Metal) include:

- Shadowslayer: "La marque de Mélanikus" (with co-writer Tony Skinner and art by Eric Larnoy, 1995, Zenda)
- Sha (with Olivier Ledroit):
  - Edition Soleil:
    - "The Shadow One" (1995, ISBN 2-87764-565-7)
    - "Soul Wound" (1996, ISBN 2-87764-648-3)
    - "Soul Vengeance" (1997, ISBN 2-87764-819-2)
  - Heavy Metal:
    - Collection of Sha (110 pages, June 2008, ISBN 1-932413-97-9)
- Requiem Chevalier Vampire (with Olivier Ledroit):
  - Requiem Chevalier Vampire (French language, Nickel Editions):
    - "Resurrection" (November 2000, ISBN 2-914420-04-8)
    - "Danse Macabre" (September 2001, ISBN 2-914420-01-3)
    - "Dracula" (May 2002, ISBN 2-914420-02-1)
    - "Le Bal des Vampires" (November 2003, ISBN 2-914420-05-6)
    - "Dragon Blitz" (November 2004, ISBN 2-914420-08-0)
    - "Hellfire Club" (November 2005, ISBN 2-914420-12-9)
    - "Le Couvent des Soeurs de Sang" (February 2007, ISBN 2-914420-19-6)
    - "La Reine des Ames Mortes" (November 2008, ISBN 2-914420-23-4)
    - "La Cité des Pirates" (February 2010, ISBN 978-2-914420-28-0)
    - "Bain de sang" (May 2011, ISBN 978-2914420365)
    - "Amours défuntes" (November 2012, ISBN 978-2914420464)
  - Requiem Vampire Knight (English language, collected two French volumes per book; Panini Comics):
    - Volume 1: Resurrection (112 pages, September 2009, ISBN 1-84653-437-2)
    - Volume 2: Dracula (112 pages, September 2009, ISBN 1-84653-438-0)
    - Volume 3: Dragon Blitz & Hellfire Club (112 pages, September 2010, ISBN 1-84653-457-7)
    - Volume 4: The Convent of the Blood Sisters & the Queen of Dead Souls (112 pages, September 2010, ISBN 1-84653-438-0)
    - Volume 5: Pirate City & Blood Bath (112 pages, November 2011, ISBN 1-84653-496-8)
- Claudia Chevalier Vampire (with Franck Tacito, Nickel Editions):
  - "La Porte des Enfers" (46 pages, December 2004, ISBN 2-914420-07-2)
  - "Femmes Violentes" (46 pages, December 2006, ISBN 2-914420-18-8)
  - "Opium rouge" (48 pages, November 2007, ISBN 978-2-914420-22-8)
  - "La Marque de la Bête" (48 pages, February 2010, ISBN 978-2-914420-25-9)
- Broz (with Adrian Smith):
  - "L'arme soeur" (2005, ISBN 2-914420-10-2)
  - "Recherché... Mort ou vif!" (December 2005, ISBN 2-914420-13-7)
- Biankha: "Princesse d'Egypte" (with Biljana Ruzicanin and Cinzia Di Felice, August 2006, ISBN 2-914409-52-4)

== Novels ==
- ABC Warriors: The Medusa War, with co-author Alan Mitchell, Black Flame, April 2004, ISBN 1-84416-109-9
- Serial Killer, with co-author Kevin O'Neill, Millsverse Books, 2017, ISBN 978-0-9956612-0-2
- Goodnight, John-Boy, Millsverse Books, 2017, ISBN 978-0-9956612-6-4

== Audio plays ==
- Doctor Who (Big Finish Productions):
  - Dead London (January 2008)
  - Scapegoat (May 2009)
  - The Song of Megaptera (May 2010)

== Television ==
Mills' 1980 comic strip story "The Star Beast" in Doctor Who Magazine was adapted for a television episode in November 2023.

== Memoirs ==
- Be Pure! Be Vigilant! Behave! 2000 AD and Judge Dredd: The Secret History, Millsverse Books, July 2017, ISBN 978-0-9956612-3-3
- Kiss My Axe! Slaine the Warped Warrior: The Secret History, Millsverse Books, December 2021, ISBN 978-1-7399580-0-8
