= Torquemada (comics) =

- 2000 AD Torquemada by Kevin O'Neill; 2000 AD copyright Rebellion A/S 2005.

Publication information
- Publisher: IPC Media (Fleetway) to 1999, thereafter Rebellion Developments
- First appearance: 2000 AD No. 167 (1980)
- Created by: Pat Mills; Kevin O'Neill

In-story information
- Alter ego: Tomas De Torquemada
- Team affiliations: Terran Tube Police; Termite Religion; The Terminators
- Abilities: Very persuasive, had the abilities to exist for an unspecified time in spectral form, "switch" bodies and control the dead

Tomás de Torquemada is the fictional main villain in the comic strip Nemesis the Warlock, published in the British comic anthology 2000 AD. He eventually appeared in 7 episodes of spin-off adventures of his own. He is named after and inspired by the real life Tomás de Torquemada.

== Fictional character biography ==
Originally the leader of The Tube Police, a fascist police force and quasi-religious order in the far future, Torquemada became the dictator of the entire human race from its base on Termight (planet Earth). Torquemada invoked humanity's history of alien enslavement and occupation, instilling in mankind a fear and hatred of all aliens, even those who were peaceful or benign. His empire waged a speciesist war against all alien species, whom Torquemada regarded as "impure". Termight's Gestapo-like Thought Detectors scanned citizens' innermost thoughts, brutalising any who questioned the regime, even in dreams.

Later in the series it was revealed that Torquemada's previous incarnations included Witchfinder General Matthew Hopkins, Colonel John M. Chivington, Adolf Hitler, and his namesake, the Spanish Inquisitor Tomás de Torquemada.

Torquemada was, nevertheless, a family man – he was distraught when Nemesis killed his children while escaping the Terminators. He loved his wife Candida to such an extent he consorted with aliens in an effort to prevent her from divorcing him.

After a teleporter accident, Torquemada lost his physical body, surviving only as a spectre. He began possessing the bodies of volunteer Terminators; their bodies soon decayed, requiring fresh replacements. This grisly process eroded Candida's sanity.

=== "Be pure! Be vigilant! Behave!" ===
Torquemada's catchphrase "Be pure! Be vigilant! Behave!" is also the title of Pat Mills' memoirs, which describe his experiences in the comics industry.

== The Terminators ==
Torquemada is served by a fanatical army of soldiers called Terminators, who are constantly at war with all alien races in the galaxy. They were originally created to liberate Termight from alien invaders, but now were used to ensure that no extraterrestrial species would ever again enslave Termight, leading to a genocidal eradication of all non-terran beings.

=== Death of a Tyrant ===
Torquemada's evil reign ended when Candida mysteriously recovered from her madness. Upon hearing the news, he had his then current wife, Sister Sturn murdered and made preparations for his second marriage to Candida. The wedding ceremony ended disastrously when his foe Nemesis appeared with Candida willingly fleeing from the temple with him.

Humiliated on live TV, his evil regime quickly crumbled but he still had one last trick. Stealing Nemesis' Blitzspear, he fled to the Hypogeum to activate a "Generation Bomb" (which would destroy all alien DNA on Earth). Before he could even activate it, Nemesis managed to contaminate him with alien DNA with his claws before using his remaining powers to make sure Torquemada would perish with him. When the bomb exploded, both Nemesis, his Blitzspear and Torquemada were merged and fell into the timestream for all eternity.

== Family ==
Torquemada's family members who have been depicted include:

- Murcalla de Torquemada (mother, alive)
- Nostradamus de Torquemada (brother, alive but insane)

He became insane when he was ambushed by the Monads and Torquemada abandoned him to his fate instead of helping him. Torquemada had him committed to a lunatic asylum, and pretended Nostradamus was his senile grandfather.

- Candida de Torquemada (wife – annulled, second marriage interrupted, alive)
- Barbarossa de Torquemada (son, dead)
- Pandora de Torquemada (daughter, dead)
- Sister Sturn (wife, dead)
- Atilla de Torquemada (son by Sister Sturn, alive)

== Publication ==
- Nemesis the Warlock (by Pat Mills):

List of Nemesis stories

As well as appearing in Nemesis the Warlock he has appeared in his own eponymous series:

- Torquemada (by Pat Mills):
  - "The Garden of Alien Delights" (with Bryan Talbot, in Dice Man No. 3, 1986)
  - "Torquemada the God" (with Kevin O'Neill, in 2000 AD #520–524, 1987)
  - "Torquemada's Second Honeymoon" (with Kevin O'Neill, in 2000 AD Annual 1988, 1987)

== Awards ==
- 1984 – won Eagle Award for Best Character
- 1985 – won Eagle Award for Favourite Villain (British Section)
- 1986 – won Eagle Award for Favourite Villain (British Section)
- 1987 – won Eagle Award for Favourite Villain (British Section)

== See also ==
- The Redeemer, another Pat Mills creation who (in the Warhammer 40,000 universe) purges mutants and deviants.
