= Alan Mitchell (comics) =

- Born: 1960 London, England
- Died: June 2016 (aged 55–56) London, England
- Area: Writer
- Notable works: Third World War
- Children: 6

Alan Mitchell (born 1960 in London, England) was a writer. He died on 22 June 2016.

== Biography ==
When Mitchell was working as a shop manager for Acme Comics in Coldharbour Lane in Brixton, South London, in 1988, he met Pat Mills. The two became writing partners.

In Crisis, a political comic from Fleetway, Mitchell worked on Books 2 and 3 of Third World War. The story covered issues including matriarchy, police racism, no-go areas, private police forces, class war, and black resistance. Mitchell also wrote the Amnesty International story "Prisoner of Justice" with artist Glenn Fabry. Mitchell partnered Mills in the first ABC Warriors novel The Medusa War for Black Library based on elements changed or removed from the scripts. According to Mills:

Parts [of the novel] are dramatisations of the comic strip. Notably the Biohazard troopers because they originally had excellent funky black dialogue contributed by my black co-writer on the novel, Alan Mitchell. This was altered at the time by 2000AD editorial without my knowledge and in an inappropriate and uncool way. It made my toes curl it was so wrong. So I thought it was important to put it back the way it should be. I think the text version is much better.

== Bibliography ==
=== Comics ===
- Third World War (with co-author Pat Mills):
  - Book II:
    - "Here be dragons" (with art by Angela Kincaid (1) and John Hicklenton (2), in Crisis #15-16, 1989)
    - "Back in Babylon" (with art by Carlos Ezquerra, in Crisis #17, 1989)
    - Untitled (with art by Carlos Ezquerra, in Crisis #18, 1989)
    - "Liats law" (with art by Duncan Fegredo, in Crisis #19, 1989)
    - "All about Eve" (with art by Carlos Ezquerra, in Crisis #20-21, 1989)
    - "Symphony of splintered wood" (with art by Sean Phillips, in Crisis #22-23, 1989)
    - "Remembering Zion" (with art by Sean Phillips, in Crisis #24, 1989)
    - "The world according to Ryan" (with art by John Hicklenton, in Crisis #25, 1989)
    - "Liats law II" (with art by Duncan Fegredo, in Crisis #26, 1989)
    - "Book of Babylon" (with art by Sean Phillips, in Crisis #27, 1989)
    - "The Dark other" (with art by John Hicklenton, in Crisis #29, 1989)
    - "The rhythm of resistance" (with art by John Hicklenton, in Crisis #30, 1989)
    - "The calling" (with art by Sean Phillips, in Crisis #31, 1989)
    - "The man with the child in his eyes" (with art by Sean Phillips, in Crisis #33-34, 1989)
    - "Black man's burden" (with art by John Hicklenton, in Crisis #35, 1990)
    - "Ivan's story: Why me?" (with art by Steve Pugh, in Crisis, #36, 1990)
  - Book III:
    - "Killing Me Softly" (with art by Glyn Dillon, in Crisis, #43-44, 1990)
    - "Anchorman" (with art by Steve Pugh, in Crisis, #50, 1990)
- "Prisoner of Justice" (with Glenn Fabry, in Crisis #52, 1990)
- Coffin (with co-author Pat Mills and art by Morak Oguntade, in Toxic! #13-23, June–August 1991)

=== Novels ===
- ABC Warriors: The Medusa War (with co-author Pat Mills, Black Library, 2004, ISBN 1-84416-109-9)
