= Malachy Coney =

Irish comics writer

- Born: Belfast
- Areas: Cartoonist, Writer, Publisher

Malachy Coney is a comics writer and cartoonist from Belfast, Northern Ireland. He grew up in Ardoyne in the north of the city.

== Biography ==
Coney's first notable comics work was a two-episode installment of Third World War, "A Symphony of Splintered Wood", co-written with Pat Mills and painted by Sean Phillips, in issues 22 and 23 of Fleetway's anthology Crisis in 1989. Mills had taken on various co-writers for episodes dealing with specific geopolitical situations, and Coney's episodes concerned Northern Ireland's "Troubles".

In 1993–94 he wrote the three issue series Holy Cross, each issue a self-contained story set in the same district of north Belfast, published by Fantagraphics Books. The first issue was drawn by Davy Francis, the second by Chris Hogg, and the third by P. J. Holden. Coney and Holden also collaborated on the Holy Cross graphic novel The Moon Looked Down and Laughed, published by Fantagraphics in 1997.

He self-published a number of small press comics during the early 1990s, including the religious satire Catholic Lad, The Good Father, a story of family and sexuality, and a gay-themed parody superhero comic, Major Power and Spunky, drawn by Sean Doran, which also appeared in the anthologies Gay Comics and Buddies, and in a one-shot published by Fantagraphics' Eros Comix imprint in 1994. Eros also published Coney and Holden's The Dandy Lion in 1997. A third gay superhero parody, The Simply Incredible Hunk, was drawn and self-published by Holden. In 1997 he contributed to the Belfast anthology DNA Swamp, writing the Irish mythological superhero series "Keltor", illustrated by Christian Kotey, and the one-off strip "Life Dreams of a Homo Pacedermus", drawn by Doran.

In 1998–1999 he had a run on Marc Silvestri's The Darkness from Top Cow/Image, initially co-written with Garth Ennis. The "Spear of Destiny" story arc introduced a new character, the Magdalena, who has since appeared in her own comic. He plotted and co-wrote, with Steven Grant, the "Hell on Earth" storyline for Harris Comics' Vampirella Monthly in 1998. The same year he co-wrote a short animated film, Second Helpings, with director Joel Simon, about a chubby 8-year-old girl and her dreams of being model-slim.

From 2003 to 2005 he wrote and drew "Ouija Board, Ouija Board", a full-page comic strip based on his observations of Belfast life and events, for the Northern Irish political and cultural magazine Fortnight, to which he also contributed articles and illustrations, and self-published one issue of Good Craic Comics in 2003. A second issue will see publication Spring 2011. He also contributed to the Belfast anthology Small Axe.

Malachy Coney's independent works are often of a colloquial nature, dealing with individuals in an urban setting trying to gain a sense of self amidst an irrational, hostile and often psychologically violent environment. His self-illustrated works recall some of the works of the American underground comic artists.

== Bibliography ==
Comics work includes:

- Third World War: "A Symphony of Splintered Wood", Crisis #22–23, co-written by Pat Mills, art by Sean Phillips, 1989
- "The Geek", Crisis No. 22, art by Jim McCarthy, 1989
- Third World War Book III, co-written with Pat Mills, art by Glynn Dillon and Rob Blackwell, Crisis #40-41, 43–48, 1990
- Third World War: "The Final Problem", co-written with Pat Mills, art by John Hicklenton, Crisis #53, 1990
- "Wyrmwood", Toxic! No. 24, art by John McCrea, 1991
- Holy Cross, 3 issue series, art by Davy Francis, Chris Hogg and P. J. Holden, Fantagraphics Books, 1993–1995
- The Good Father, self-published, 1993
- Major Power and Spunky, art by Sean Doran, self-published, 1992
- "Major Power and Spunky", Gay Comics No. 20, art by Sean Doran, 1993
- Major Power and Spunky, art by Sean Doran, Fantagraphics/Eros, 1994
- "Major Power and Spunky", Buddies #4–5, art by Sean Doran, 1995
- The Moon Looked Down and Laughed, graphic novel, art by P. J. Holden, Fantagraphics Books, 1997
- The Dandy Lion, art by P. J. Holden, Fantagraphics/Eros, 1997
- The Simply Incredible Hunk, art by P. J. Holden, self-published by Holden, 1997
- "Keltor", DNA Swamp #1–3, art by Christian Kotey, 1997
- "Life Dreams of a Homo Pacedermus", DNA Swamp No. 1, art by Sean Doran, 1997
- "Wake Up", Gay Comics No. 25, art by Sean Doran, 1998
- The Darkness #11–22 (#11–14 co-written by Garth Ennis), art by Joe Benitez and others, Top Cow/Image, 1998–1999
- Spirit of the Tao #1–5, co-written by D-Tron and Billy Tan, art by Billy Tan, Top Cow/Image, 1998
- Tales of the Darkness #1–4, 1/2 (#1–2 co-written by Brian Haberlin), drawn by various artists, Top Cow/Image, 1998–1999
- Vampirella Monthly #10–11 (#11 co-written by Steven Grant), art by Louis Small Jnr., Harris Comics, 1998
- "Ouija Board, Ouija Board", Fortnight, 2003–2005
- Good Craic Comics No. 1, Self-Published/Arts Council NI, 2003
- The Colour of Love, painted art by Sean Hamilton, Tales of the..., 2010
