= Jason Brashill =

British comic book artist

- Area: Artist

Jason Brashill is a British comic book artist.

== Biography ==
He has worked for 2000 AD, mainly on cover work (where he started in 1994) and the lead strip Judge Dredd, as well as some British small press comics, like The End Is Nigh.

He, and Jim Murray, produced the prop comic work for Spaced, which featured Simon Pegg's character as a comic artist.

Currently he resides near Seattle, where he works in the computer games industry for Valve, the creators of Half-Life, working on games like Left 4 Dead 2.

== Bibliography ==
- Judge Dredd:
  - "Terror with Mrs. Gunderson" (with John Wagner, in Judge Dredd Megazine vol. 2 #80, May 1995)
  - "Language Barrier" (with John Wagner, in 2000 AD #950, July 1995)
  - "Hammerstein" (with Pat Mills, in 2000 AD #960-963, October 1995)
  - "Lethal Weapon" (with John Wagner, in Judge Dredd Megazine vol. 3 #17, May 1996)
  - "Camp Demento" (with John Wagner, in 2000 AD #1045-1046, June 1997)
  - "In the Year 2120" (with John Wagner, in 2000 AD #1077, January 1998)
  - Batman/Judge Dredd: Die Laughing #1 (with Alan Grant/John Wagner, DC Comics, October 1998)
  - "Ape Town" (with Alan Grant, in Judge Dredd Megazine vol. 3 #47, November 1998)
  - "Christmas Angel" (with John Wagner, in 2000 AD #1123-1124, December 1998)
  - "Lock, Stock & Two Smokin' Lawgivers" (with Alan Grant, in 2000 AD #1175, January 2000)
  - "Suspicious Minds" (with Alan Grant, in 2000 AD #1177, January 2000)
  - "After the Bombs" (with John Wagner, in 2000 AD #1420-1422, January 2005)
- Outlaw: "Deadliest Man Alive" (with Paul Neal, in 2000 AD #1000, 1996)
- Harlem Heroes: "Hike Harlem Heroes" (with David Bishop/Steve MacManus, in 2000 AD #1034, 1997)
- The Spacegirls (with David Bishop, in 2000 AD ##1062-1066, 1997)
