= Paul Neal =

British comics writer

- Area: Writer
- Notable works: Outlaw

Paul Neal is a British comics writer. He has worked for Fleetway Publishing on Judge Dredd Megazine and the long running science fiction anthology 2000 AD in the late 1990s. Much of his work was created in collaboration with the artist Marc Wigmore.

He later went on to co-own and manage The Hive chain of three comic shops on the south coast of England. The first of these was in the North Laine area of Brighton on Kensington Gardens whilst further branches opened in The Guildbourne Centre in Worthing, and The Enterprise Centre in Eastbourne. The Hive no longer exists after the business was declared bankrupt in 2001 after six years of trading.

== Biography ==
His first published work was a Judge Hershey story published in the Judge Dredd Megazine. A number of other Judge Hershey stories and one Judge Dredd story were published in the same title in the following months.

His first work for 2000AD came later and was published in Prog 1000. Called Outlaw, it detailed the story of the lead character, known as "The Deadliest Man Alive", trying to rescue his daughter from an evil arms manufacturer. Outlaw ran for thirteen instalments with five different artists. The final instalment suggested a second series of Outlaw was forthcoming but, as yet, there has been no mention in the pages of 2000 AD that a sequel is planned.

Neal has recently been published in the successful British independent comic The '77. In that publication his stories involved three 2000 AD alumni working on the art, including John McCrea, Glenn Fabry and Steve Pugh.

He has three children and two grandchildren.

== Bibliography ==
- Judge Hershey (with Marc Wigmore):
  - "Spider in the Web" (in Judge Dredd Megazine #3.09-3.10, 1995)
  - "Barbara" (in Judge Dredd Megazine #3.11, 1995)
  - "The Enemy" (in Judge Dredd Megazine #3.12-3.13, 1995–1996)
  - "Sacrifices" (in Judge Dredd Megazine #3.18, 1996)
  - "I Don't Believe in Love" (in Judge Dredd Megazine #3.28, 1997)
- Judge Dredd (with Marc Wigmore):
  - "The Shooting" (in Judge Dredd Megazine #3.14, 1996)
  - "The Wounded" (in Judge Dredd Megazine #3.17, 1996)
  - "The Incorruptible (In Judge Dredd The Elseworlds Mega Special #1, 1996)
- Other 2000 AD work.
  - Outlaw: "Deadliest Man Alive" (with Jason Brashill (1), Simon Davis (2-3, 13-14), Marc Wigmore (4-5), Clint Langley (6-7) and Tom Carney/David Millgate (8-12), in 2000 AD #1000-1013, 1996)
  - Vector 13: "Case Seven: The Immortality Question" (with Cyril Julien, in 2000 AD #1030, 1997)
- The'77.
  - Animal Kingdom (in "The '77 issue 6 2021) (with John McCrea and coloured by Darren Stephens)
  - House Wins (in The'77 Annual, Winter 2021) (with Glenn Fabry)
  - The Devil Men (in The'77 Annual, Winter 2021) (with Steve Pugh)
  - "The Mary Celeste And The Frogs" (in The '77 issue 8 2022) With Antonio Valjean
- Tripwire Magazine.
  - The Three Nuns (with John Charles artist)
  - Time And The Professor (with Ian D Peterson)
  - Clock! (with Lyndon Webb)
