= John Hicklenton =

British comics artist (1967–2010)

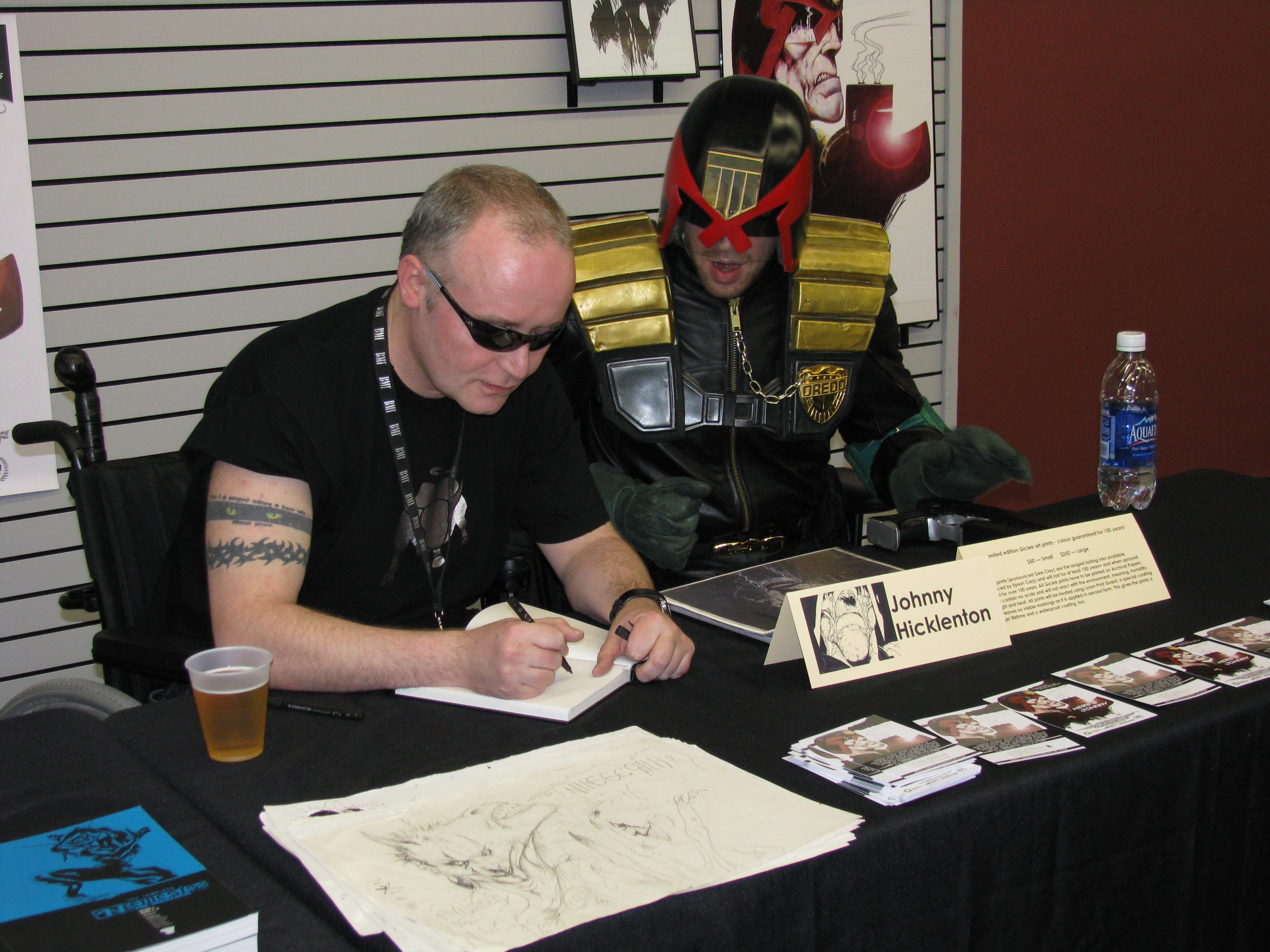
- Hicklenton at a book signing in Austin, Texas, 2008
- Born: 8 May 1967 Guildford, Surrey, England
- Died: 19 March 2010 (aged 42) Schwerzenbach, ZH, Switzerland
- Areas: Penciller, Artist, Inker
- Pseudonym: John Deadstock
- Notable works: Nemesis the Warlock
- Awards: Eagle Award, Grierson documentary award x 2

John Hicklenton (8 May 1967 – 19 March 2010), aka John Deadstock, was a British comics artist best known for his brutal, visceral work on flagship 2000 AD characters like Judge Dredd (in particular Heavy Metal Dredd) and Nemesis the Warlock during the Eighties and Nineties.

He had multiple sclerosis and recorded an award-winning documentary about living with the condition. On 19 March 2010, Hicklenton chose to end his life at Dignitas in Switzerland.

== Comics ==
Hicklenton got his first break when he realised a friend at college was Ron Smith's daughter so he made her a Judge Dredd Christmas card.

However, regular work remained elusive until, on the advice of his mother, he phoned Pat Mills directly and their working relationship developed from there. He did other work with Mills including a strip in the now defunct CoolBeansWorld site. He also drew ZombieWorld (as John Deadstock) for Dark Horse Comics, who commissioned him because, as Mills has said "John is the ultimate horror artist ... I defy anyone to show me an artist whose monsters are more grotesque, whose zombies have a more ghastly look in their eye."

== Here's Johnny ==
He was diagnosed with multiple sclerosis in 2000. Here's Johnny, a documentary about his illness produced by Animal Monday, launched at the Science Museum on 30 January 2008, followed by its world première at the South by Southwest film festival in Austin, Texas. It got its television debut on More4 on 17 February 2009. The film took over 5 years to make and documents his brave and often humorous battle against MS. The film was favourably reviewed by the British Medical Journal and in 2008 won an unprecedented two Grierson Awards for "Best Newcomer" and "Best Arts Documentary".

== Later activities ==
He continued to draw, working on projects like Sand for Renegade Arts Entertainment, and also focused on bringing multiple sclerosis as a disease to the public's attention in order to help those with the condition to fight for better treatment and research from the medical community. In his final year he wrote and illustrated his graphic novel, 100 Months (published by Cutting Edge Press), which he finished the day before he died.

== Death ==
On 23 March 2010 Pat Mills announced via the 2000 AD forums that Hicklenton had died the previous week following his battle with multiple sclerosis. Hicklenton had travelled to Switzerland and died on 19 March at Dignitas.

== Bibliography ==
Comic work includes:

- Tharg's Future Shocks (collected in The Best of Tharg's Future Shocks, Rebellion Developments, November 2008, ISBN 1-905437-81-1):
  - "You're Never Alone With a Phone" (with Neil Gaiman, in 2000 AD No. 488, 1986)
  - "The Invisible Etchings of S Dali" (with Grant Morrison, in 2000 AD No. 515, 1987)
- Nemesis the Warlock (with Pat Mills):
  - "The Two Torquemadas (Book VII)" (in 2000 AD #546–557, 1987–1988, collected in The Complete Nemesis the Warlock Volume 2, Rebellion, August 2007, ISBN 1-905437-36-6)
  - "Deathbringer (Book IX)" (in 2000 AD #586–593 and #605–608, 1988–1989, collected in The Complete Nemesis the Warlock Volume 3, Rebellion, December 2007, ISBN 1-905437-48-X)
- Third World War (with Pat Mills):
  - "Here be dragons" (in Crisis No. 16, 1989)
  - "The word according to Ryan" (with co-authors Pat Mills/Alan Mitchell, in Crisis No. 25, 1989)
  - "The Dark other" (in Crisis No. 29, 1989)
  - "The rhythm of resistance" (in Crisis No. 30, 1989)
  - "Black man's burden" (in Crisis No. 35, 1990)
- "Ryan of the Yardies" (script and art, in Crisis No. 30, 1989)
- Rogue Trooper (Friday): "Circus Daze" (with Michael Fleisher, in Rogue Trooper Annual 1991, 1990)
- Judge Dredd:
  - "Black Widow" (with John Wagner, in Judge Dredd Megazine (vol. 1) #7–9, April–June 1991)
  - "Resyk Man" (with Alan Grant, in Judge Dredd Megazine (vol. 2) No. 20, January 1993)
  - "Fat Bottom Boys" (with Robbie Morrison, in Judge Dredd Mega Special 1995, July 1995)
  - "Blood of Satanus III: The Tenth Circle" (with Pat Mills, in Judge Dredd Megazine #257–265, May–December 2007)
- The Fear Teachers (with Pat Mills/Tony Skinner, in Toxic! #28–31, October 1991)
- Strange Cases: "Skin Games" (with John Smith, in Judge Dredd Megazine (vol. 1) No. 17, February 1992)
- Heavy Metal Dredd:
  - "The Fan" (with John Wagner/Alan Grant, in Judge Dredd Megazine (vol. 2) No. 19, January 1993)
  - "Too Much Monkey Business" (with John Wagner/Alan Grant, in Judge Dredd Megazine (vol. 2) No. 21, February 1993)
  - "The Most Dangerous Guitar in the World" (with John Wagner/Alan Grant, in Judge Dredd Megazine (vol. 2) No. 22, February 1993)
  - "Mort Rifkind Rises Again" (with John Smith, in Judge Dredd Megazine (vol. 2) No. 23, March 1993)
  - "The Big Hit" (with John Smith, in Judge Dredd Megazine (vol. 2) No. 24, March 1993)
  - "Graceland" (with David Bishop, in Judge Dredd Megazine (vol. 2) No. 25, April 1993)
  - "Monkey Beat" (with John Smith, in Judge Dredd Megazine (vol. 2) #34–35, August 1993)
  - "Kiss of Death" (with Jim Alexander, in Judge Dredd Megazine (vol. 2) No. 36, September 1993)
- Pandora (with Jim Alexander):
  - "Pandora" (in Judge Dredd Mega Special 1994, June 1994)
  - "Mural Scream" (in Judge Dredd Megazine (vol. 2) #77–81, April–June 1995)
- Mean Machine: "Visiting Time" (with John Wagner, in Judge Dredd Megazine (vol. 2) No. 82, 1995)
- "Trespass" (with Gordon Rennie, in Inferno! No. 8, 1998)
- "Cycles of Chaos" (with Andy Jones, in Warhammer Monthly No. 9, November 1998)
- ZombieWorld: "Tree of Death" (with Pat Mills, Dark Horse, 4-issue mini-series, 1999, collected in ZombieWorld: Winter's Dregs, 2005, ISBN 1-59307-384-4)
- 100 Months (script and art, October 2010, ISBN 0-9565445-2-5)
