= The Redeemer (Black Library comic) =

Comic mini-series published by Warhammer Monthly

Publication information
- Publisher: Black Library; Warhammer Monthly
- Schedule: Monthly
- Format: Mini-series
- Genre: Military science fiction
- Publication date: June - September 2002
- No. of issues: 4

Creative team
- Created by: Pat Mills; Debbie Gallagher
- Written by: Pat Mills; Debbie Gallagher
- Artist(s): Wayne Reynolds
- Letterer(s): Fiona Stephenson
- Colourist(s): Len O'Grady
- Editor(s): Marc Gascoigne; Andy Jones

Collected editions
- The Redeemer: ISBN 1-84154-274-1

The Redeemer is a special, 4-issue comic mini-series published by Warhammer Monthly, Games Workshop's monthly comic collection. It was written by veteran British comic writer Pat Mills and novelist Debbie Gallagher.

Set on the Hive World of Necromunda, The Redeemer chronicles the battles of a small band of Redemptionists, fanatical and homicidal cultists of the Emperor, led by their supreme leader and arch-maniac, Klovis the Redeemer, as they fight to stop the Caller, a deadly and extremely powerful Ratskin Shaman, who is leading a horde of Ratskins, Scalies, Plague Zombies and other Underhive Scum in a revolution against the nobles of the Spire.

== Plot ==
The first issue (Epistle) opens with the Redeemer and his maniacs purging a group of Ratskins for a crime Malakev (the narrator) cannot even say (they tried to run away). As Klovis tells one Ratskin that he should be thanking him for rewarding him with a martyr's crown, the Ratskin tells Klovis that he is sick in the head and calls to the Hive Spirits asking for vengeance for the deaths of his people. At this the Caller, the self-proclaimed Shaman of Shamans, bursts from the ground riding a giant Millasaur. He attacks the Redemptionists, proclaiming his intention to lead a revolution of Ratskins to vengeance against the Hivers. Klovis drives him off with a blast of fire from his crown, but the Caller later attacks the Redeemer at his own camp. After fighting him off, and discovering that the Bloodmare Stone (An eye from one of the- if not the- last of the Giant Necromunda Spiders) is the source of his great power, Klovis and his band set out deeper into the Underhive to purge the Caller. The remainder of this issue deals with the Redeemer slaying a mutant gang boss in a duel so that he and his men can head further down.

In the second issue, the Caller gathers his armies and the Redeemer is captured by a psyker called Ferron Voor, the Emissary of Karloth Valois; Master of Plague Zombies, who drains the life from several of his men to reanimate a monstrous mutant rat, with which he tries to kill Klovis (only to die in the process).

In the third issue, Klovis and the Caller's armies finally battle with each other, the Slaught-drugged Redemptionists wreaking great havoc whilst Klovis manages, in a superhuman effort, to destroy the Rat God (from the last issue), the Bloodmare Spider Queen and the Caller, despite being badly wounded in the process. The power leaking from the crumbling Bloodmare Stone turns his zealots against him, leading to Klovis scourging his own men. In the end, only one survives: Malakev, who is shown on the second last page of the issue to have been converted into a Scribe-Servitor, a mindless cyborg slave who will spend the rest of his existence writing down Klovis' deeds.

== Collected editions ==
The series has been collected as a trade paperback:

- The Redeemer, (by co-authors Pat Mills and Debbie Gallagher, with artist Wayne Reynolds, Black Library, 4-issue mini-series, tpb, 96 pages, 2000, ISBN 1-84154-120-6, tpb with 8-page bonus strip by Andy Jones, 104 pages, 2003, ISBN 1-84154-274-1)

== See also ==
- Torquemada, an earlier Pat Mills character who purged deviants.
