= Finn (2000 AD) =

Publication information
- Publisher: Fleetway Publications
- First appearance: Crisis #1 (17 September 1988)
- Created by: Pat Mills; Carlos Ezquerra

In-story information
- Alter ego: Paul Phillips (or Paul Shawcross)
- Team affiliations: Green Army; Eve Collins
- Abilities: White magic Hand of Glory

Finn
- Cover of 2000 AD #770, 1992 featuring Finn. Artwork by Jim Elston.
- Created by: Pat Mills

Publication information
- Publisher: IPC Media (Fleetway)
- Schedule: Weekly
Title(s)
Crisis
2000 AD
- Genre: Fantasy; Magic
- Publication date: 1989–1996
- Number of issues: 53

Creative team
- Writer(s): Pat Mills; Tony Skinner
- Artist(s): Jim Elston; Liam Sharp; Paul Staples
- Letterer(s): Gordon Robson; Steve Potter
- Editor(s): Steve MacManus and Michael W. Bennent; Tharg (Richard Burton); Tharg (John Tomlinson)

Finn is a fictional pagan warlock eco-terrorist created by Pat Mills. He first appeared in British fortnightly anthology comic Crisis and later moved to an eponymous series in 2000 AD after Crisis was cancelled.

== Publication history ==
Finn first appeared as a supporting character in the Crisis strip Third World War in 1988. After Crisis was cancelled in 1991 Finn disappeared from publication until 1994 when Mills brought him back for his own series. The character was popular but the series ended in 1996. According to David Bishop the reason the character was suspended was due to concerns that he was in danger of duplicating the appeal of Mills's Sláine. Mills has speculated that part of the reason was because some readers were complaining in the letters page about Finn "being a sinister witch and saying his authentic pagan practices were a bad example to readers".

== Plot summary ==
Finn is the alias of Paul Phillips. In Third World War it is established that Paul was once a soldier in the British Army stationed in Northern Ireland, but he deserted to become Finn, an eco-terrorist fighting to save the planet from multi-national corporations. Third World War began as a relatively realistic story set in 2000, with very little in the way of fantasy or science fiction elements, but that changed as Finn became more prominent.

In the eponymous strip in 2000 AD it emerged that the leaders of the corporations were in fact a secret society of powerful aliens called Newts. In this strip Finn was a mini-cab driver in Plymouth by day, and a white witch fighting the aliens by night. He used military equipment alongside magical items such as the Hand of Glory.

== Bibliography ==
He first appeared as a supporting character in the series Third World War in the comics magazine Crisis; then in the eponymous strip in 2000 AD:

- "Third World War" (Crisis)
  - Issues #1-27, 29-38, 40, (Note: "Third World War" focuses on Finn in Book Three: The Big Heat, from issue #40.) 41, 43, 44, 46-53
- Finn:
  - "Finn Book 1" (by Pat Mills/Tony Skinner, with art by Jim Elston (1-10) and Kevin Wicks (5-10), in 2000 AD #770-779, 1992)
  - "Finn Book 2" (by Pat Mills/Tony Skinner and Jim Elston/Kevin Wicks, in 2000 AD #807-816, 1992-1993)
  - "Origins of Finn" (by Pat Mills and Liam Sharp, in 2000 AD #924-927, 1995)
  - "Interventions" (by Pat Mills and Paul Staples, in 2000 AD #928-937, #940-949, 1995)
  - "Season of the Witch" (by Pat Mills and Paul Staples, in 2000 AD #991-999, 1996)

=== Reprints ===
- "Finn Book 1" (in Classic 2000 AD #13-14, 1996; Judge Dredd Megazine #329, 2012)
- Third World War Book One (Rebellion Developments, January 7, 2020) ISBN 978-1781087510
- Third World War Book Two: Back to Babylon (Rebellion Developments, January 5, 2021) ISBN 978-1781089293

== Sources ==
- Bishop, David (2007). Thrill-Power Overload. Rebellion Publishing. ISBN 978-1-905437-22-1.
- McAuley, Chris (15 October 2017). "Finn, Eco Warrior, Lover, Cabbie". Talking Comics.
- Mills, Pat (21 July 2017). Be Pure Be Vigilant, Behave: 2000AD and Judge Dredd: The Secret History. Millsverse Books. ISBN 978-0995661233.
