= Third World War (comics) =

British comic book story

- The cover to the hardcover version of Rebellion Publishing's Third World War Book One collected edition; (clockwise from top) Eve Collins, Finn, Garry, Trisha, Ivan. Art by Carlos Ezquerra.
- Publisher: Fleetway Publications
- Publication date: 17 September 1988 – December 1990 1989
- Title(s): Crisis #1-27; 17 September 1988 to 16 September 1989; Crisis #29-38; 14 October 1989 to 17 February 1990; Crisis #40-51; 17 March to October 1990; Crisis #53; December 1990
- Main character(s): Eve Collins; Finn

Creative team
- Writer(s): Pat Mills with Alan Mitchell (#17-21, #24-48 and #53); Malachy Coney (#22-23); Tony Skinner (#49-51)
- Artist(s): Carlos Ezquerra (#1-6, #9-14, #17-18, #20-21); D'Israeli (#7); Angela Kincaid (Note: Credited as 'Angie Mills') (#8, #15); John Hicklenton (#16, #25, #29, #35, #53); Duncan Fegredo (#19, #26); Sean Phillips (#22-24, #27, #31, #33-34); Richard Piers Rayner (#30, #38); Glyn Dillon (#32, #40-44); David Pugh (#36, #49-51); Robert Blackwell (#37, #45-48); Tim Perkins (#38)
- Editor(s): Steve MacManus; Michael Bennent

"Third World War" is a British political comic story. It was originally published in the adult-orientated anthology comic Crisis between 17 September 1988 and December 1990. Written primarily by Pat Mills and initially with art from Carlos Ezquerra, the story was set in the near-future and studied the effect of global corporations on the developing world.

The story debuted the character of Finn, who was later revisited by Mills in 2000 AD.

== Creation ==
Pat Mills had written scores of stories for Fleetway Publications' forerunner IPC Magazines throughout the 1970s, including being the creative force behind the titles Battle Picture Weekly, Action and 2000 AD, but as the 1980s had worn on found himself increasingly unhappy with both the constraints on his writing within the British industry and growing unhappiness with the poor deal given to creators. Steve MacManus' brief to create the adult-orientated Crisis, and the more generous contracts prepared for the title that gave creator rights and royalties far beyond that offered by the company however interested him, and Mills leapt at the chance to create a story with a political slant. The premise of "Third World War" went against MacManus' brief to create an adult superhero title, but he felt the story was strong enough to work regardless. MacManus had originally envisioned the title as a flipbook called 50/50, with a cover either side and each half of the contents designed by a different graphic artist. Rian Hughes was assigned to design the "Third World War" half, but the format was overridden by management. The comic was retitled Crisis, and Hughes' design also encompassed the front cover, where "Third World War" would be a fixture for most of its run.

Mills felt the market for politically conscious readers had been proven by the initial success of Action, and had endeavoured to keep many of its themes going in 2000 AD as science fiction provided a "mask" for such storytelling, feeling "there are real heroes and real villains out there — often disguised but potentially a subject for great drama". The writer felt the reaction to Margaret Thatcher created an appetite for political stories that weren't forced to masquerade as allegory; while he "found that really exciting" he conceded "it wouldn't last, so I decided to make the most of it".

One of his inspirations was a news item he had read around the time of LiveAid, which revealed that at the same time of the 1983–1985 famine in Ethiopia, large parts of the country were given over to coffee plantations producing beans for the Western market. Mills took pains to add realism by using acquaintances as inspiration and sounding boards for the characters, an approach he likened to that of filmmaker Mike Leigh. Young writer Tony Skinner worked with Mills on the vast amount of research for the project which was necessary as Mills had never visited Latin America at the time.

FreeAid was inspired by the Department for International Development and the United States Agency for International Development, feeling both were more sinister than the frequently suspected CIA and MI5 due to their more subtle actions. Mills also felt the International Monetary Fund were complicit was distrustful of large corporations, who "make the Joker look like small fry." Carlos Ezquerra, who had a large British following from his work on the likes of "Strontium Dog", was selected as artist. MacManus recalled him being the first choice for the series, describing him as "the preeminent artist working in British comics of the time"; however, Mills' recollection was that he first approached Ian Gibson, who refused due to objecting to Eve potentially choosing suicide over military service. Mills felt that even though "Third World War" took aim at global capitalism he did not feel it was a Communist story but instead as extolling his view that Western countries "shouldn't be" involved in the governments of the Third World.

== Publishing history ==
After a promising start, sales of Crisis had nosedived and MacManus was forced to re-evaluate the comic's format. The device of two long, parallel stories was abandoned, though "Third World War" survived to continue while "New Statesmen" was phased out. Later, the first book was repackaged by Quality Communications for the American market when no extant publishers came forward. Third World War became a six-issue limited series, with new covers by Fegredo, Glenn Fabry, Sean Phillips, Paul Johnson, and Phil Winslade.

As per Mills' plans, the second book (from Crisis #15) saw the focus switch to the UK. Wanting to keep the realism high, he turned to other writers to help with various parts of the story. Young Northern Irish writer Malachy Coney was recruited to help with a storyline set in Belfast (MacManus had sounded out Garth Ennis, but Mills found Coney first). Mills has defended the change in direction, citing his previous works such as switching the focus to Blue in "Charley's War" and reinventing "Ro-Busters" as "ABC Warriors" as showing "changing gear is legitimate, provided everything else is right".

Mills, who believed comic characters shouldn't be "politically correct, moral icons" looked for a permanent replacement. However, in the case of Crisis he found it difficult to find artists similarly passionate about the subject matter rather than seeing the title as a stepping stone in their careers, though he would concede many of the artists — such as Duncan Fegredo — did "an excellent job". Fegredo filled in on two chapters as he prepared to work on Kid Eternity with Grant Morrison for DC Comics, and drew on Simon Bisley and Bill Sienkiewicz for influences. He would later note "I've never really been a political person" but enjoyed the experience of working on the story. Glyn Dillon, then 18 years old, illustrated three chapters also using Sienkiewicz as inspiration. Books II and III covered issues including matriarchy, police racism, no-go areas, private police forces, class war, and Black resistance.

By 1990 Crisis was once again in sales trouble, being switched to monthly publication and trying to find a new format to survive. "Third World War" petered out and finally ended in Crisis #53 (dated December 1990) Mills was unhappy with the decision, believing editorial were attempting to sell what he would describe as "cappuccino comics" for an easier sale. He would later continue Finn's story in 2000 AD.

After the cancellation of Crisis in 1991 and the collapse of Maxwell's empire after his death, the elements of the comic and its stories that Fleetway owned passed to Egmont Publishing. In 2016 they were sold on to Rebellion Developments, who began reprinting strips from various titles. The first "Third World War" began being collected in 2020, under Rebellion's Treasury of British Comics label. The collection was restored with scans of original artwork provided by the late Ezquerra's son Hector, though some pages had to be remastered from scanned original issues of Crisis. Rebellion editor Oliver Pickles stated he hoped to collect the whole "Third World War" across four volumes at a rate of one a year. The second volume, collecting part of Book Two, featured some edits to dialogue to remove racial slurs; while a foreword explained these were used to show the racist attitudes of the characters using them, the publishers felt the censorship left the authors' meaning clear.

== Plot summary ==
In 1994, Western military sponsorship in the Third World grows, with multinational corporations charged with the undertaking for the security. This initially leads to boycotts and civil disturbances until FreeAid (Free World Agency for International Development) is founded in 1997 to restore Third World stability, and in 1999 establishes the Youth Selection Board to recruit troops for the FreeAid Peace Forces.

=== Book One ===
In 2000, Eve Collins has just turned 18 and has found herself conscripted by the YSB to join the Peace Forces, after an attempt to escape by taking a drug overdose fails. Instead she is simply assigned to a Psychological Warfare Battalion (known as 'Psychos') in Central America with a group of fellow misfits — Armageddon-obsessed Ivan, self-proclaimed witch Paul, zealot Trisha and Garry, whose insanity resulted in him actually volunteering for the Peace Forces. The squad are involved in a mission to relocate villagers, with orders to kill any who resist, distributing vouchers and gifts from the likes of Multi-Foods and Coola Cola to smooth things over. Garry guns down a suspected terrorist during a house clearance, and after it is cleared the village is destroyed to deny it to Guerrilla Army of the Poor. Garcia's wife later immolates herself rather than be taken in by FreeAid. Eve writes about meeting a boy named Jose, a street child obsessed with Coola Cola, an unhealthy soft drink promoted to children by mascot Multi-Food Mickey. She rewrites the piece after seeing rebel propaganda, but superior Lieutenant Ward convinces her to remove the critical parts after arguing the actions of FreeAid are preferable to a massive war. The unit was assigned to guard the factory from protesters, but Jose and his fellow street-children reveal themselves to be working for the guerrillas, and blow up the factory in a suicide attack. Their next mission is fitting remote villages with satellite TV, designed to brainwash them to FreeAid's way of thinking with propaganda. Eve and Paul discover that many of the villagers are already docile zombies due to Parathion pesticide being sprayed on crops entirely to kill off thrips that only cause cosmetic damage to the oranges grown by the farmers. Finding common ground, Eve and Paul share a kiss while the unit amuses itself mocking the devout Trisha until they come under rebel attack. Terrified, Eve kills one of the attackers, and is chided by Paul for betraying her principles in order to survive.

At a barrio near their base, the Psychos find the rebels are using a man dressed up as a superhero called Super Barrio to try to counter FreeAid propaganda. Later they discuss the Green Army, a paramilitary environmental group led by Finn. The people of the barrio are set to be moved to a FreeAid 'New Start' housing scheme (in reality, a prison camp); Eve and Garry are corralled into wearing superhero costumes as 'Silver Saviour' and 'Multi-Man' respectively to counter Super Barrio's popularity but have limited success and the relocation soon turns ugly, with Super Barrio suffering a heart attack after a fight with Garry. The Psychos also encounter the Madres, a group of women who carry out a dance for the liberation of political prisoners whose members are often targeted by government death squads. An escaped Madre called Monica begs them for help and they take her to safety. Eve and Paul survey the dumping grounds for the death squads' victims with Monica, but the death squad are tipped off by a former officer known to Paul. Paul and Eve are saved by Monica and her allies, who kill the officer and the death squad before escaping. Eve's squad are then sent to persuade a tribe of Indians to abandon planting maize in favour of vegetables Multi-Foods wants for export. Their leader Xoyon objects, believing it is better for his people to grow food for themselves rather than crops to sell so they can buy food from the multinational, and because maize is tied into his people's identity and religion. Paul meanwhile sabotages a truck carrying radioactive waste for FreeAid; they blame the villagers, and the Indians are massacred. Eve is alarmed at his disregard for life — which convinces her Paul is really Finn. Full-blown revolution finally breaks out in the country, and the puppet dictator and his regime is evacuated; the Psychos are being prepared for withdrawal, though Garry is injured. Trisha volunteers the reluctant team to help rescue orphans for PR reasons but find the local orphanage is a cover for black market organ harvesting. FreeAid destroy their infrastructure as they pull out, while Finn swears Eve to secrecy over his identity. She helps him secure documents left behind before they leave the country by helicopter and the Guerrilla Army of the Poor take the capital. Eve meanwhile hands over her diary of third world atrocities to Lieutenant Ward in exchange for a scholarship. He morphs into Multi-Food Mickey and explains that the loss of the country is barely a setback for a multinational.

=== Book Two: Back to Babylon ===
Eve returns to London on R&R, continuing to have conversations with Micky about Multi-Foods. The corporation is just as active in Britain as in Central America, justified by a desire to keep pace with the industries of Korea and Taiwan. Eve meets up with her friend PURPLE, and then her boyfriend Rohan. His outspoken nature has seem him overlooked for a job in the educational sector and he is in line for conscription to FreeAid himself. Eve asks Finn to provide him with fake ID, and he agrees in return for help him raiding an animal research lab. Eve, Finn and Rohan meet with Ivan and Trisha at a party, and Finn gives Rohan the fake ID as 'Mark St. Vincent' but evades questions about whether he and Eve have ended their relationship. Walking home, Eve and Rohan are targeted by the police on the basis of their skin colour; Rohan is arrested and beaten; the police find he has a card of the Black African Defense Squad, though Rohan claims to be ignorant of its meaning. Eve begs Ward to get him free, and is left owing the Lieutenant a favour. The police meanwhile are being supplemented by the even more brutal private agency Safecorp due to growing unrest. Safecorp inspector Ryan realises Rohan is using a fake ID, as he personally killed the real St. Vincent. The pair are forced to flee from armed Safecorp troopers, and once they are safe Rohan admits to Eve he is a member of BADS.

The pair are helped by some of Rohan's friends but are at each others' throats over Eve's relationship with 'Paul'. Meanwhile Eve's affluent parents — chat show host Bill and his wife Shola — try to work out where she's gone. Eve accompanies Rohan towards BADS' stronghold in New Azania (formerly Brixton) fighting past racist gangs before they meet Sparrow, another member of BADS, and get to safety. Eve meets up with her Northern Irish friend Michael along with Finn; the pair soon clash when Michael reveals he knows 'Paul' from his army service in Belfast. The pair make an awkward truce after explaining their experiences of the Troubles to each other, and Michael leaves. Eve then tells Finn she has decided to fight alongside BADS instead of joining the Green Army.

Eve finds out more about BADS, her roots and Rastafari. Ryan — a racist completely obsessed with Eve and the idea of turning her into a submissive black woman — meanwhile continues his brutal search for BADS' leadership. by interrogating 'Sonny Boy' Clinton, uncle and mentor of the organisation's leader Liat. Liat and his right-hand man Barrington search for Sonny Boy, while Eve's understand of the cause continues to grow and she plans to quit FreeAid to join BADS, particular feminist wing the Mothers of New Azania. However, Rohan ends their relationship, and a furious Eve joins a riot against Safecorp, impressing Sparrow.

Eve tells her father of her decision to join New Azania, while Liat puts together a squad to rescue Sonny Boy from prison. However, Ryan has Eve arrested as she walks home. The interrogation is interrupted when Sonny Boy's drunken neighbour Shebeego arrives at Safecorp with information about Liat's whereabouts. Ryan takes both Shebeego and Eve to meet with Sonny Boy. Once there, Shebeego reveals himself to be Liat in disguise; he and Eve break Sonny Boy out, and she shoots the predatory Ryan in the genitals. The group makes it back to New Azania, though Sonny Boy's torture at the hands of Safecorp has left him dying, greatly affecting Liat until Sonny Boy tells to remember the ordinary people of the community are the real heroes and to listen to the Mothers, before dying.

Ryan survives, albeit castrated, and descends further into insanity, recalling his childhood experiences in the Mau Mau rebellion, and his mother's affair with a Kenyan native, both of which fuelled his racism. Grieving Sonny Boy and side-lined by the rise of the Mothers, Liat disappears, suffering an identity crisis. Eve helps Sparrow find for him; Liat has met the real Shebeego, who tells him Sonny Boy was his father and that his mother was killed by Ryan. Liat goes undercover as Prince Kwame of Lesotho to infiltrate the home of aristocrat Lord Michael Courtney, discovering proof of Multi-Foods' relationship with slavery. However, his identity is known and the powerful Courtney is planning to wipe out Liat and his followers.

=== Book Three: The Big Heat ===
Finn makes for New Azania to see his former fellow soldier 'Skates' Fiyahman; both had similar outlooks on army life. Eve is delighted to see him again, while Finn and Fiyahman reunite. Fiyahman has called Finn in to help; he claims he has renounced the eco-terrorism to live as a farmer — though his payment for helping is weaponry, and he appears to instead be remodelling the Green Army for a new offensive. However, his truck of equipment is stolen by a group called the Bullion Boys, led by Slik. They locate the truck, but find it empty. Eve meets Trisha, who is working at a FreeAid-sponsored evangelical church near New Azania under control of the Reverend, where she is running a birth control programme with help from Ivor. Eve takes her to New Azania; Trisha has also deduced that Paul is Finn and attempts to talk him out of his Pagan beliefs. After going to fetch Fiyahman, Eve returns to find Finn and Trisha in bed, and is left feeling let down by them both.

She begins seeing Fiyahman instead, but the pair are captured by Bullion Boys and taken to the Reverend, He offers Fiyahman a chance to put New Azania under the control of his exploitative umbrella, but they refuse and flee. With Finn's help they recover the weapons and kill the Reverend, leaving Eve disillusioned about the role of religion in her life.

=== Book Four: Ivan's Story ===
Ivan meanwhile is still plagued by nightmares of Mickey the Multi-Foods Dragon, and after being arrested for being drunk and disorderly has become a protester. However, he discovers his girlfriend Barrie is a prostitute, used by a Multi-Foods executive known as 'Dragon'. Barrie disappears, and is not the first prostitute to vanish after being hired by the Dragon. Ivan sets out to find her, and discovers the Dragon is led of a ritualistic secret society of Freemasons which includes numerous influential businessmen. He encounters Finn, who massacres the sect, and Ivan realises he is Paul. While Finn gets Ivan and Barrie to safety he is unhappy that his operation with the Green Army has been complicated. The pair return home, but are targeted by a brutal white South African linked to the Freemasons known as the Anchorman, who murders Barrie before she can leave with Ivan. Ryan meanwhile corners and brutally fights Liat; both eventually fall from a flat window to a bloody death, much to the delight of Courtney.

== Story index ==
Book I
Issues: 1-14
Episodes: 14
Pages: 196 of strip, plus 14 pages of text
Script: Pat Mills
Art: Carlos Ezquerra episodes 1-6, 9-14; D'Israeli 7; Angie Mills 8
Dated: 17/9/88 to 18/3/89

Book II
Issues: 15-27, 29-38
Episodes: 23
Pages: 322
Script: Pat Mills 1-23; with Alan Mitchell 3-7, 10-23, and Malachy Coney 8-9
Art: Angie Mills 1; John Hicklenton 2, 11, 14, 20; Carlos Ezquerra 3-4, 6-7; Duncan Fegredo 5, 12; Sean Phillips 8-10, 13, 18-19; Sean Phillips & Shaun Hollywood 16; Richard Piers-Rayner 15; Richard Piers-Rayner & Tim Perkins 23; Glyn Dillon 17; Steve Pugh 21; Robert Blackwell 22
Dated: 1/4/89 to 17/2/90
Note: Segments "Ivan’s Story" in #36 and "Ryan’s Story" in #25, 29 and 35 conclude in Book IV.

Book III: The Big Heat
Issues: 40-41, 43-48
Episodes: 8
Pages: 112
Script: Pat Mills and Alan Mitchell
Art: Glynn Dillon 1-4; Rob Blackwell 5-8
Dated: 17/3/90 to 7/7/90

Book IV
Ivan’s Story
Issues: 49-51
Episodes: 3
Pages: 42
Script: Pat Mills and Tony Skinner
Art: Steve Pugh
Dated: 21/7/90 to Oct 90
Note: Episodes 2-4 of story beginning in #36.

The Final Problem
Issue: 53
Episodes: 1
Pages: 14
Script: Pat Mills and Alan Mitchell
Art: John Hicklenton
Dated: Dec 90
Note: Fourth episode of "Ryan’s Story," from #25, 29, 35.

== Collected editions ==
Title	ISBN	Publisher	Release date	Contents
Third World War Book One	9781781087510	Rebellion Publishing	9 January 2020	Material from Crisis #1-14
Third World War Book Two: Back to Babylon	9781781089293	Rebellion Publishing	5 January 2021	Material from Crisis #15-24, #26-27 and #30-34

== Reception ==
While Mills has gone on the record several times to criticise Crisis, he remains proud of "Third World War" itself. In 2003, he listed the story alongside "Charley's War" as his favourites from his own work.

Reviewing the American printing of the series for Amazing Heroes in 1991, Len Wong described the story as "pure propaganda" but that "everything is presented in a well-written, believable fiction".

Retrospective criticism of the series has been mixed. Reviewing the first Rebellion collection for Slings & Arrows, Frank Plowright sympathised with Mills' approach and praised his research of what were obscure events at the time but felt "the hectoring spirit now wears in concentrated doses". Luke Williams was of a similar mind when covering the volume for Down the Tubes, noting the story was "hard hitting politically and quite savage" but noted it often became a screed when "strip’s plots slow to a crawl as it becomes a diatribe with a plot attached". Both had similar views on the second collection; Plowright felt the constant changes of artist added to scattershot scripting, and surmised "the stories are as mixed as the art, with Mills orchestrating a multi-agenda polemic that rarely settles long enough in one place to do it justice". Williams conversely felt the varied artists were actually a strength, instead feeling its weakness was "extended sequences where characters just pontificate".
