= Diceman (comics) =

British comic

- Cover of Diceman no. 5 (painted by Hunt Emerson)

Publication information
- Publisher: Fleetway
- Schedule: Every 2 months
- Format: Comics anthology
- Publication date: Feb. 1986 – Oct. 1986
- No. of issues: 5
- Editor: Simon Geller

Diceman was a short-lived British comic which ran for five issues in 1986. It was a spin-off from 2000 AD and was devised by Pat Mills, who also wrote almost all of the stories. It was edited by Simon Geller, but purported to be edited by a monster called Mervyn. The stories were designed to be played like gamebooks. Each issue contained two or three such stories and was published every two months.

== Stories ==
The comic mostly contained stories based on characters who already appeared regularly in 2000 AD. Its eponymous character Diceman, also known as Rick Fortune, was created specially for the comic (by Pat Mills and Graham Manley), but did not appear until the second issue. Fortune was a "psychic investigator", a 1930s American private detective with psionic powers. He also had a pair of stone dice, recovered from the ruins of Atlantis, which he could use to summon various powers including a three-headed lizard demon called Astragal to assist him. The Diceman strip was different from the others in that the reader not only had to avoid being killed, he also ran the risk of being driven insane (if his "sanity score" dropped to zero).

The only other story in the comic which was not derived from 2000 AD was "You are Ronald Reagan in: Twilight's Last Gleaming", a satirical spoof in which the reader, playing the part of the American president, must prevent nuclear war breaking out. In contrast to the strip Diceman, this strip also had a sanity score, but if it got too high, then the Secret Service assume that the president must have been replaced with an imposter (a comment on Reagan's perceived intellectual limitations). This game was exceptionally difficult compared with the others in the comic, as the player must make irrational decisions to avoid arrest and execution, while trying to make the right decisions to prevent a nuclear launch by either side. In fact the player transpires to have very little control over the outcome, and almost every option inevitably results in World War III, suggesting that nuclear diplomacy is very difficult to control once Cold War tensions have begun.

The other strips which appeared in Dice Man were Judge Dredd, Nemesis the Warlock, Sláine, Rogue Trooper, Torquemada and ABC Warriors.

== Creators ==
=== Writers ===
- Pat Mills: Diceman, Nemesis, Sláine, Rogue Trooper, ABC Warriors, Judge Dredd (with John Wagner), You Are Ronald Reagan!
- Simon Gellar: Rogue Trooper
- John Wagner: Judge Dredd (with Pat Mills)

=== Artists ===
- Steve Dillon: Diceman, ABC Warriors, Rogue Trooper
- Bryan Talbot: Judge Dredd, Nemesis
- Kevin O'Neill: Nemesis
- David Lloyd: Sláine
- Nik Williams: Sláine
- Mark Farmer: Sláine
- Graham Manley: Diceman
- John Ridgway: Diceman
- Mike Collins: Rogue Trooper
- Hunt Emerson: You Are Ronald Reagan!

== List of stories ==
Judge Dredd
House of Death
Issue: 1
Pages: 20
Story: John Wagner
Game: Pat Mills
Art: Bryan Talbot
Dated: February 1986

Nemesis The Warlock
The Torture Tube
Issue: 1
Pages: 19
Story/Game: Pat Mills
Art: Kevin O’Neill
Dated: February 1986

You Are Torquemada: The Garden of Alien Delights
Issue: 3
Pages: 20
Story/Game: Pat Mills
Art: Bryan Talbot
Dated: June 1986

Sláine
Cauldron of Blood
Issue: 1
Pages: 19
Story/Game: Pat Mills
Art: David Lloyd
Dated: February 1986

Dragoncorpse
Issue: 2
Pages: 19
Story/Game: Pat Mills
Art: Nik Williams
Dated: April 1986

The Ring of Danu
Issue: 4
Pages: 28
Story/Game: Pat Mills
Art: Mike Collins / Mark Farmer
Dated: August 1986

Diceman
In The Bronx, No-one Can Hear You Scream!
Issue: 2
Pages: 24
Story/Game: Pat Mills
Art: Graham Manley
Dated: April 1986

Dark Powers
Issue: 3
Pages: 19
Story/Game: Pat Mills
Art: John Ridgway
Dated: June 1986

Bitter Streets
Issue: 4
Pages: 29
Story/Game: Pat Mills
Art: Steve Dillon
Dated: August 1986

Murder One
Issue: 5
Pages: 28
Story/Game: Pat Mills
Art: Steve Dillon
Dated: October 1986

ABC Warrior
Volgo The Ultimate Death Machine
Issue: 2
Pages: 11
Story/Game: Pat Mills
Art: Steve Dillon
Dated: April 1986

Rogue Trooper
Killothon
Issue: 3
Pages: 19
Story/Game: Pat Mills
Art: Steve Dillon
Dated: June 1986

Space Zombies!
Issue: 5
Pages: 15
Story/Game: Simon Gellar
Art: Mike Collins
Dated: October 1986

You Are Ronald Reagan!
Twilight’s Last Gleaming!
Issue: 5
Pages: 17
Story/Game: Pat Mills
Art: Hunt Emerson
Dated: October 1986
