= Clint Langley =

British comic book artist (born 1970)

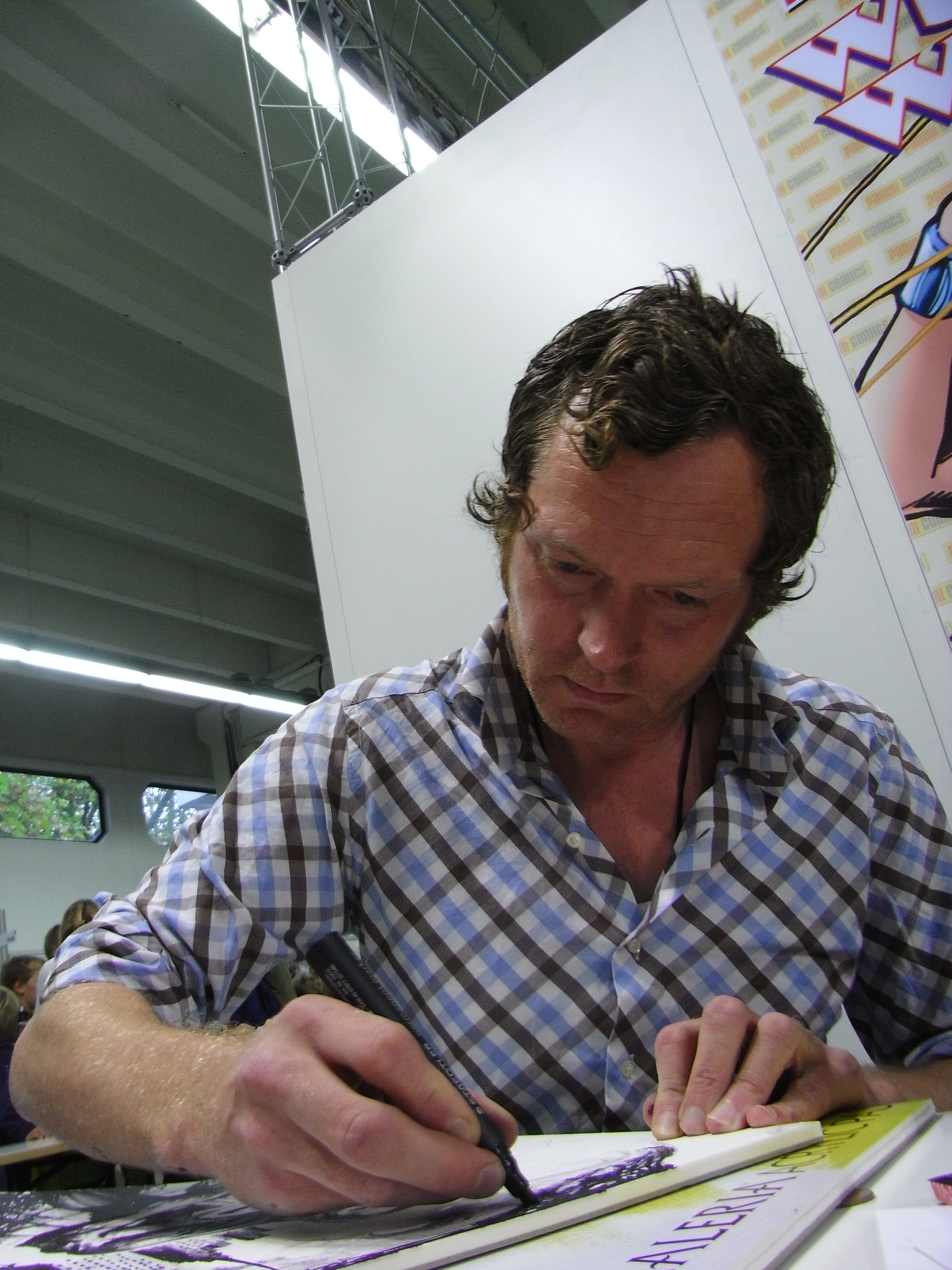
- Clint Langley 2009 in Essen
- Born: July 30, 1970 (age 56)
- Areas: Penciller, Inker, Colorist
- Notable works: ABC Warriors; Sláine

Clint Langley (born July 30, 1970) is a British comic book artist best known for his work on series with Pat Mills at 2000 AD and as the cover artist for Marvel Comics' Guardians of the Galaxy.

He is an artist who combines painting, photography and digital art and as well as his work in comics, he has provided the art for role-playing games and collectible cards.

== Early life ==
Langley went to Hastings College and studied art and design.

== Career ==
Langley's first published work was with Nighfall Games's role-playing game SLA Industries in 1993. His work appeared in their first three books, SLA Industries, Karma and Mort, for which he painted the cover. He also provided the large wrap-around painting for the game's GM's screen. He returned to SLA Industries in 2019, contributing 3 pieces, including the back cover art, to the source book: Cannibal Sector One.

Langley began his career at 2000 AD on Dinosty with Pat Mills, and went on to work on some of the comics flagship titles, like Judge Dredd and Sinister Dexter.

He has since repeatedly collaborated with Mills, most notably on his long-running series ABC Warriors and Sláine. Mills also has formed Repeat Offenders with Langley and Jeremy Davis "to develop graphic novel concepts with big-screen potential" and the first project was a graphic novel called American Reaper. It has been optioned by Trudie Styler's Xingu Films and Mills will be writing the screenplay.

Since 2007 he has also got work in the American comic book market providing covers for Marvel Comics, especially those connected with Dan Abnett, who he worked with on Sinister Dexter, leading to a run on the modern incarnation of the Guardians of the Galaxy.

== Bibliography ==
=== Comics ===
- Dinosty (with Pat Mills, in 2000 AD #873–882, 1994)
- Judge Dredd: "Enemy Below" (with John Tomlinson as Sonny Steelgrave, in 2000 AD #886–887, 1994)
- Nemesis the Warlock: "Hammer of the Warlocks" (with Pat Mills, in 2000 AD #901–903, 1994)
- Sláine (with Pat Mills):
  - "Lord of Misrule, Part I" (in 2000 AD #958–963, 1995)
  - "Lord of Misrule, Part II" (in 2000 AD #995–998, 1996)
  - The Books of Invasions: Moloch and Golamh (2006, ISBN 1-904265-82-0):
    - "The Books of Invasions I: Moloch" (in 2000 AD #1322–1326 and Prog 2003)
    - "The Books of Invasions II: Golamh" (in 2000 AD #1350–1355)
  - The Books of Invasions: Scota and Tara (2006, ISBN 1-904265-92-8):
    - "The Books of Invasions III: Scota" (in 2000 AD #1371–1376)
    - "The Books of Invasions IV: Tara" (in 2000 AD #1420–1425 and Prog 2005)
  - The Books of Invasions: Odacon (July 2007, ISBN 1-904265-92-8):
    - "The Books of Invasions V: Odacon" (in 2000 AD #1436–1442)
    - "Carnival" (in 2000 AD #1469–1475 and Prog 2006)
  - Slaine the Wanderer (2011, ISBN 978-1-907992-24-7):
    - "The Gong Beater" (in 2000 AD #1635–1638)
    - "The Amber Smuggler" (in 2000 AD #1662–1665)
    - "The Exorcist" (in 2000 AD, #1709–1712)
    - "The Mercenary" (in 2000 AD, #1713–1714 and Prog 2011)
- Outlaw: "Deadliest Man Alive" (with Paul Neal, in 2000 AD #1005–1006, 1996)
- Holocaust 12: "Storm Warning" (with Chris Standley and John Smith, in Judge Dredd Megazine (vol. 3) #29–33, 1997)
- Sinister Dexter: "F.A.Q" (with Dan Abnett, in 2000 AD #1076, 1998)
- Darkblade: "Darkblades" (with Dan Abnett, in Warhammer Monthly No. 50, December 2001)
- The Vampire Hunter's Tale (with Stu Taylor, in Warhammer Monthly No. 52, February 2002)
- Tales of Telguuth: "The Rousing of Rezir" (with Steve Moore, in 2000 AD #1287–1288, 2002)
- ABC Warriors (with Pat Mills):
  - "The Volgan War V1" (in 2000 AD #1518–1525, 2007)
  - "The Volgan War V2" (in 2000 AD #1550–1559, 2007)
  - "The Volgan War V3" (in 2000 AD #1601–1606, 1611–1616, 2008)
  - "The Volgan War V4" (in 2000 AD #1666–1677, 2010)
  - "Return to Earth" (in 2000 AD #1800–1811, 2012)
- American Reaper (with Pat Mills, graphic novel, Repeat Offenders, forthcoming; serialised in Judge Dredd Megazine #316-ongoing, 2011)

=== Covers ===
Cover work includes:

- 2000 AD #877, 886, 894, 902, 958, 995, 998, 1002, 1025, 1277, 1323, 1326, 1332, 1339, 1351, 1355, 1363, 1372, 1375, 1398, 1400, 1420, 1425, 1437, 1442, 1445, 1456, 1466, 1470, 1475, 1519, 1522, 1524, 1551, 1555, 1559, Prog 2008, 1603, 1606, 1611 and 1616 (1994–2009)
- Annihilation: Conquest: Wraith #1–4 (Marvel Comics, 2007)
- Ghost Rider: Danny Ketch #1–4 (Marvel Comics, 2008)
- Guardians of the Galaxy #1–10 (Marvel Comics, 2008–2009)
- City of Dust #1–5 (Radical Comics, 2008–2009)
- Hercules: Knives of Kush #1–5 (Radical Comics, 2009)
- Dark Reign: Hawkeye #1–5 (Marvel Comics, 2009)
- Realm of Kings one-shot (Marvel Comics, January 2010)

=== Role-playing games ===
- SLA Industries (Nightfall Games, 1993)
- Magic: The Gathering (1997–2006)
- Violence (cover only, Hogshead, 1999)
- Werewolf: The Forsaken (White Wolf, 2005)
- World of Warcraft Stackable Tins – Silvermoon Vs Exodar

=== Books ===
- The Art of Clint Langley (96 pages, April 2008, Simon & Schuster, ISBN 1-84416-518-3, Black Library, ISBN 978-1-84416-518-6)
