= Andy Jones (game designer) =

- Occupation: Game designer

Andy Jones is a game designer who has worked primarily on wargames and board games.

== Career ==
Warhammer game designers Rick Priestley and Andy Jones worked with Fighting Fantasy and fiction author Marc Gascoigne to develop an idea through the new Black Library division of Games Workshop to publish a book of short stories and comics in a format similar to an Annual publication; this was developed into the magazine Inferno!, and a previewed was published in White Dwarf #210 (June 1997) while the first issue was published the following month in July 1997.

Jones has also worked on Warhammer 40,000 comics for the Black Library, including The Redeemer (with Pat Mills, Wayne Reynolds, and Debbie Gallagher, 4-issue mini-series, tpb, 96 pages, 2000, ISBN 1-84154-120-6, tpb with 8-page bonus strip, 104 pages, 2003, ISBN 1-84154-274-1) and with Mark Gascoigne edited Flames of Damnation (various creators, 224 pages, 2005, ISBN 1-84416-253-2).
