= The Butterfly Children =

The Butterfly Children (musical)
- Music: Martin Lee; Paul Curtis; David Kane
- Lyrics: Martin Lee; Tony Curtis; David Kane
- Basis: Pat Mills and Angela Mills books, The Butterfly Children
- Productions: 1990 - Mitchell Theatre; 1992 - West End

The Butterfly Children is the title of a series of children's books created by husband and wife team Pat and Angela Mills. The books were published during the 1990s by Peter Haddock Ltd. In 1990 a musical based on the characters was staged featuring songs written by Martin Lee, Paul Curtis and David Kane. A corresponding album was recorded in 1992 by pop group Brotherhood of Man.

== Books ==
The books are short picture books, illustrated by Angela Mills and written by her and her then husband Pat Mills. Some of the later books were written by other writers such as Greta Landen and Elisabeth Sackett. The stories concern a group of elf-like figures called the Butterfly Children who perform good deeds within a forest. Other characters include the overseeing birds, D.C., and Jack the Lad, and the villainous Moth Gang.

A number of books were produced such as Ice and Lullabies, The Big Race, Shrieks and Showers, Summer Sleep, Whizzing Through the Woods and Finders Keepers.

== Musical ==
In 1990, Martin Lee teamed up with established songwriter Paul Curtis and the unknown David Kane to write a musical based on the books and the characters. Together they composed The Butterfly Children musical. Some of the songs were named after the books, such as Finders Keepers and The Big Race, while the characters of D.C. and Jack the Lad also had song written about them. The show was intended, like the books, for children and the songs, while essentially pop, had a range of styles including rap, rock 'n' roll and country and western.

The musical had its world premiere at the Mitchell Theatre in Glasgow, to open the 1990 Glasgow City of Culture, directed by Dougie Squires; it ran for a month and was performed by the Mitchell Theatre for Youth.

Just three months later, the show transferred to the larger Kings Theatre in Glasgow and ran for two weeks, beginning with a royal command performance in front of HRH Princess Margaret. The show transferred in late 1992 to London's West End for a limited period but with new script and production team, it didn't live up to its previous incarnation. It has not been performed since.

== Album ==
The Butterfly Children

Studio album by Brotherhood of Man
- Released: September 1992
- Genre: Pop
- Length: 57:45
- Producer: Martin Lee

Brotherhood of Man chronology
Lightning Flash (1983)	The Butterfly Children (1992)	Greenhouse (1997)

The songs from the musical were recorded by pop group Brotherhood of Man — one of the composers, Martin Lee, was a member — in 1992. The album was released on cassette tape only and was never commercially released. The cassette was available, however, to buy at shows. Some of the songs were later included on audio book versions of The Butterfly Children books. The album cover describes the content as "A sparkling pop musical". The group's name doesn't appear on the cover of the album, although the credits on the inside sleeve name the singers as Martin Lee, Sandra Stevens, Nicky Stevens and Lee Sheriden (Brotherhood of Man). The group, who had achieved much success in the 1970s as a pop outfit, here tackled the songs' varying styles, such as rap on "Jack the Lad", gospel on "Finders Keepers", Country and Western on "Piece Patrol" and rock on "Wings" as well as a spoken-word song, "The Moth Ball Spoof". Among the 19 tracks, the lion's share of the lead vocals went to Martin Lee, although all the group's members received at least one lead, while other songs were group efforts or joint vocals by Sandra and Nicky.

This was the first album by the group since 1983's Lightning Flash, although they had recorded some songs a year previously with Dutch producer Eddy Ouwens, which went unreleased. The album remains officially unreleased, although a number of tracks are currently available on YouTube.

=== Track listing ===
Side One

1. "The Butterfly Children" (Lee / Curtis) 2.57
2. "Jack the Lad" (Lee / Curtis) 3.04
3. "Moth Gang" (Lee / Curtis) 2.42
4. "Sunshine All the Way" (Lee / Curtis) 4.07
5. "It's Great to Be a Butterfly" (Lee / Curtis) 3.11
6. "Wings" (Lee / Kane) 3.40
7. "The Big Race" (Lee / Kane) 2.34
8. "Finders Keepers" (Lee / Curtis) 3.04
9. "Butterfly Ball" (Lee / Curtis) 2.02
10. "The Moth Ball Spoof" (Lee / Curtis) 2.16
11. "He Looked at Me" (Lee / Curtis) (0.43)

Side Two

1. "Butterfly Rock" (Lee / Curtis) 4.21
2. "Hey D.C." (Lee / Curtis) 3.43
3. "Always You and I" (Lee / Curtis) 3.28
4. "Isn't it Sad/She Looked at Me" (Lee / Curtis) 1.46
5. "Piece Patrol" (Lee / Kane) 2.33
6. "What Would Happen if Christmas Never Came" (Lee / Curtis) 4.26
7. "Just When it Seems Impossible" (Lee / Curtis) 3.08
8. "Butterfly, Butterfly" (Lee / Kane) 4.00

=== Personnel ===
Lead vocals:

- Martin Lee: "The Butterfly Children", "Jack the Lad", "Moth Gang", "The Big Race", "Finders Keepers", "The Moth Ball Spoof", "Butterfly Rock", "Hey D.C.", "Isn't it Sad/She Looked at Me", "Just When it Seems Impossible"
- Sandra Stevens: "It's Great to Be a Butterfly", "He Looked at Me", "What Would Happen if Christmas Never Came"
- Nicky Stevens: "Always You and I"
- Lee Sheriden: "Piece Patrol"
- Produced by Martin Lee
