= Nemesis the Warlock =

Alien comic character and series

- Cover of Nemesis the Warlock trade paperback collected edition. Art by Kevin O'Neill.

Character information
- First appearance: 2000 AD No. 167 (July 1980)
- Created by: Pat Mills; Kevin O'Neill

In-story information
- Team affiliations: Credo, the Cabal
- Partnerships: Chira (wife); Thoth (son); Great Uncle Baal
- Abilities: Extensive magical powers, powerful psionic, alien anatomy

Publication information
- Publisher: IPC Media
- Schedule: Weekly
- Genre: Science fiction
- Publication date: July 1980 – December 1999
- Main character(s): Nemesis the Warlock; Torquemada

Creative team
- Writer(s): Pat Mills
- Artist(s): Kevin O'Neill; Jesus Redondo; Bryan Talbot; Tony Luke; John Hicklenton; David Roach; Paul Staples; Clint Langley; Henry Flint; Carl Critchlow; Chris Weston

Reprints
- Collected editions
- The Complete Nemesis the Warlock: ISBN 1-905437-11-0

Nemesis the Warlock is a comic series created by writer Pat Mills and artist Kevin O'Neill which appeared in the pages of the British weekly comics anthology 2000 AD. The title character, a fire-breathing demonic alien, fights against the fanatical Torquemada, Grand Master of the Terran Empire in Earth's distant future, and his attempts to exterminate all alien life.

== Publication history ==
The series began in 1980, in prog 167 of 2000 AD, with a story called Comic Rock "Terror Tube", in which a freedom fighter called Nemesis escaped from Torquemada, the chief of the Tube Police, after a protracted chase through a complex travel-tube system on a planet called Termight, later revealed to be Earth ("Mighty Terra"). All that was seen of Nemesis was the outside of his streamlined organic spaceship, the Blitzspear. In "Terror Tube" the police were portrayed as a cross between the Spanish Inquisition (Torquemada is named after the notorious inquisitor Tomás de Torquemada) and the Ku Klux Klan (or from Spanish Easter penitents), making it easier to position them as the villains.

"Terror Tube" was the first of a planned series of one-offs inspired by popular music, called "Comic Rock" – in this case The Jam's "Going Underground". The series never got going, but did produce a second Nemesis story, a two-parter called "Killer Watt", in which Torquemada chased Nemesis through a bizarre teleport system based on telephone lines.

These stories proved popular, prompting Mills and O'Neill to develop a regular series, Nemesis the Warlock, which combined the early high-concept science fiction with fantasy in the "sword and sorcery" mould. Torquemada was promoted from chief of the Tube Police to Grand Master of Termight. Nemesis was revealed as a demonic alien with a horned dragon-like head based on the finned nose of his Blitzspear, fighting to protect aliens from Torquemada's genocidal tyranny, although his inhuman attitude and anarchic "Khaos" philosophy gave him an ambiguous morality; for example, in Book Five, "The Vengeance of Thoth", Nemesis is forced to hijack a bus full of children, which he then deliberately crashes, killing all on board as he escapes.

Book Nine concluded in 1989, and the character barely appeared for ten years. Finally, in 1999, Mills and artists Henry Flint and O'Neill wrapped up the series with Book Ten: The Final Conflict, and an epilogue of sorts, Deadlock, which explored the political state of Termight in the aftermath of Nemesis' and Torquemada's deaths.

== Production ==
O'Neill's imaginative, grotesque art helped to establish the popularity of the series, but the efforts he put into creating it led to a low rate of productivity. There were a number of delays in the publication of Book One, and a second book was drawn by Jesus Redondo. This and the higher rates of pay available in America led O'Neill to leave the series prior to Book Four – although a handful of episodes he had drawn just after "Killer Watt" introduced the fourth book. O'Neill was replaced by Bryan Talbot. Other artists to draw the series include John Hicklenton, David Roach, Clint Langley and Henry Flint. O'Neill returned to the strip to illustrate its intended last-ever episode and later for a special anniversary story.

== Characters ==
=== Warlocks ===
Nemesis

Warlocks are a sexually dimorphic species of aliens who are capable of sorcery. Both males and females are horned, fire-breathing and of demonic appearance; females have a centaur-like quadrupedal morphology while males are bipedal but have unusual combination plantigrade / digitigrade leg joints, somewhat resembling satyrs.

Nemesis the Warlock
The main character and antihero of the series, Nemesis ostensibly fights to free the galaxy from tyranny. Mills decided that with a religious fanatic as the arch-villain, it would be fitting to have a demon as the hero.
Chira
White Warlock and first wife of Nemesis, mother of his son Thoth. Assassinated by agents of Termight.
Magna
Black Warlock and second wife of Nemesis. Jealous of Chira, she swallowed Nemesis' familiar Grobbendonk whole as the first phase of her plan to separate him from his allies, and leaked information to Torquemada that allowed him to locate Chira and Thoth. Killed by Nemesis minutes after their wedding, when her telepathic block failed and he discovered her misdeeds.
Thoth
Son of Nemesis and Chira. As a hideous larva-like infant he hypnotizes Sir Hargan, the Terminator who killed his mother, into believing him to be a cute little human baby that he needed to protect. Years later he grows into a powerful rival to Nemesis, as he blames his father for not being there to save his mother.
Great Uncle Baal
Nemesis' eccentric great uncle and former master of Grobbendonk, banished by Nemesis for his controversial experiments on humans.

=== Humans ===
Tomas de Torquemada
Primary antagonist of the series, a haughty tyrant and fascist human supremacist who rules the Earth with an iron fist and is hellbent on ridding the universe of all alien life. Through Past life regression it is shown that he was many people from Earth's history, including Matthew Hopkins, Colonel John Chivington, Adolf Hitler and the original Torquemada himself. His motto is "Be Pure! Be Vigilant! Behave!"
Purity Brown
Human aide to Nemesis. Her father was taken away and presumably killed when she was only fourteen (as revealed in Book Five; The Vengeance of Thoth) by thought detectors for having a dream in which he insulted Torquemada.
Candida de Torquemada
Wife of Tomas de Torquemada and mother of two of his children, both of whom are among those slain in a bus crash caused by Nemesis. On several occasions, including a major plot arc for book 5, Tomas is shown to genuinely love Candida to the extent he is willing to consort with aliens in an effort to prevent her from leaving him.
Sister Stern
Insane wife of Tomas de Torquemada and mother of his third child, whom she occasionally considered impure, so tried to commit Filicide, before Tomas ordered her to commit suicide.
Grand Dragon Mazarin
The leader of Termight after Torquemada's death. A reformer, he ended the persecution of aliens. After a Terminator mutiny upon Torquemada's return he was executed by Tomas via torture.
Nostradamus de Torquemada
Insane brother of Tomas de Torquemada. He was horribly disfigured when Tomas abandoned him during an ambush by the Primords, and was later hidden away in a lunatic asylum to conceal Tomas' disgrace. Nostradamus was originally introduced into the series as Tomas' Grandfather, and not shown to be his brother until Book five.

=== Other aliens ===
Grobbendonk
The comical little rat/caterpillar-like alien familiar of Nemesis stolen from his Great Uncle Baal. Grobbendonk speaks Gibberish, a Fringe World dialect. Deliberately eaten alive by Magna days before her wedding to Nemesis.

=== Robots ===
The ABC Warriors
Robot mercenaries and allies of Nemesis.

== Stories ==
Most of the saga was told in 'books' of between 9 and 20 episodes, with additional stories told in one-offs, which appeared in annuals, specials, or in the weekly comic. There are a number of collections of the original instalments available, which roughly follow the books as they were originally published. The first four books were not given individual titles upon their original publication.

Book number	Title	Progs	Artist(s)	Summary	Collected editions		
Book number	Title	Progs	Artist(s)	Summary	Titan (1980s)	Complete (2007)	Definitive (2023-26)
1	The World of Termight	222–233, 238–240, 243–244	Kevin O'Neill	Nemesis had previously appeared in the stories "Terror Tube" (prog 167), "Killer Watt" (progs 178–179) and "Olric's Great Quest" aka "The Sword Sinister" (Sci-Fi Special 1981).	Book 1	Volume 1	Volume 1
2	The Alien Alliance	246–257	Jesus Redondo	Takes the war to a variety of planets throughout the galaxy and features a plot by Torquemada to destroy the alien resistance.	Not reprinted	Volume 1	Volume 1
3	The World of Nemesis	335–349	Kevin O'Neill	Features Chira, Nemesis' mate and the birth of Thoth, son of Nemesis. Chira is killed by imperial assassins and Thoth is adopted by Sir Hargan, his mother's killer.	Book 2	Volume 1	Volume 2
4	The Gothic Empire	387–406	Kevin O'Neill (first two episodes), Bryan Talbot	Originally intended to be the first full-length Nemesis story, other stories were written as an introduction to the character and his world(s), ballooning into the preceding three books. Torquemada is killed at the end of this book. Thoth, growing in power, is still in the 'care' of Sir Hargan and his wife.	Book 3	Volume 1	Volume 2
5	The Vengeance of Thoth	435–445	Bryan Talbot	Starting ten years after the end of Book Four, an earlier version of Torquemada is brought through time by Thoth, so that he can punish his mother's murderer. Nemesis ends up causing the deaths of Barbarossa de Torquemada and Pandora de Torquemada; offspring of Candida & Tomas. Satanus re-appears.	Book 4	Volume 2	Volume 3
6	Torquemurder!	482–487, 500–504	Bryan Talbot	The introduction of the Monad. This book also gives the explanation for Torquemada's "grandfather" Nostradamus' words in the previous book about Termight ending in "a sea of fire and blood".	Book 5	Volume 2	Volume 3
6	Torquemada the God	520–524	Kevin O'Neill	A five-part story not run under the Nemesis banner, although the final episode concludes with a "End of book 6" banner. Torquemada consolidates his power on Terra, but is affected by a curious malady, which is eventually revealed to be a plot by Thoth to punish Tomas further, by killing his former incarnations.	Book 6	Volume 2	Volume 3
7	The Two Torquemadas	546–557	John Hicklenton	Nemesis and Purity go back in time to 15th-century Spain to retrieve Thoth. Torquemada goes back in time to kill Thoth and prevent his degradation. Tomas de Torquemada meets his namesake.	Book 7	Volume 2	Volume 4
8	Purity's Story	558–566	David Roach	During an interlude Purity recalls how she first met Nemesis, remembering details that had previously been blocked from her.	Book 8	Volume 3	Volume 4
9	Deathbringer	586–593, 605–608	John Hicklenton	Tomas escapes the time wastes into 1980s Britain, leaking time radiation as he does so. Subsequent side effects of the radiation leak create upheaval, and Tomas seizes on this to become variously a slum landlord and chief of police.	Book 9	Volume 3	Volume 4
10	The Final Conflict	1165–1173 and Prog 2000^{[a]}	Henry Flint (all except for last episode), Kevin O'Neill	The last series-length Nemesis story, after more than a decade of appearing only in brief stories not billed as "books". "The Hammer of Warlocks", a three-episode story, served as a prelude to this book, telling the story so far and Torquemada's intentions of finding this ultimate weapon against the Warlock. The series ends with Nemesis and Torquemada both destroyed, yet occasionally haunting Earth in spectral forms, tied to the Warlock's "Blitzspear". Purity Brown takes over as leader (president) of Termight, renaming it Terra.	n/a	Volume 3	Volume 5

a. This Prog 2000 was a special edition outside the comic's normal numbering scheme released to mark the year 2000. Another issue numbered 2000 was published within the comic's normal numbering scheme in 2016.

The series Deadlock, by Pat Mills and Henry Flint, was a direct sequel to Nemesis. Prog 2000 (20 September 2016) featured a follow-up Nemesis story (written by Mills and once more drawn by O'Neill) 'Tubular Hells' which reversed the destruction of Nemesis but it has to this point not led to further exploration of the character.

== Collected editions ==
The series has been collected into a number of trade paperbacks, including:

- The Complete Nemesis the Warlock:
  - Volume 1 (collects "Terror Tube", "Killer Watt", Nemesis the Warlock Books 1–4, "The Sword Sinister" and "The Secret Life of the Blitzspear", 320 pages, Rebellion, 2007, ISBN 1-905437-11-0)
  - Volume 2 (collects Nemesis the Warlock Books 5–7, Rebellion, 2007, ISBN 1-905437-36-6)
  - Volume 3 (collects Nemesis the Warlock Books 8–10, Rebellion, 2007, ISBN 1-905437-48-X)

The covers of the webstore exclusive hardback volumes of The Definite Collection

- The Definitive Edition: Published in large-format size measuring 307 x 231mm, it was available in a standard paperback edition, and an exclusive-to-webstore hardback edition.
  - Volume 1: collects Terror Tube, Killer Watt, The Sword Sinister, The World of Termight (Book 1), The Alien Alliance (Book 2), The Secret Life of Blitzspear and A Day in the Death of Torquemada, Rebellion, 2023, ISBN 9781837860104 (standard paperback edition), ISBN 9781837861477 (webstore exclusive hardback edition)
  - Volume 2: collects The World of Nemesis (Book 3), The Gothic Empire (Book 4) and Ego Trip, 192 pages, Rebellion, 2024, ISBN 9781837862702 (standard paperback edition), ISBN 9781837862788 (webstore exclusive hardback edition)
  - Volume 3: collects Vengeance of Thoth (Book 5), Torture Tube, The Garden of Alien Delights, Torquemurder (Book 6) Part 1 and Part 2, Torquemada the God, Forbidden Planet, A Bedtime Story and Torquemada's Second Honeymoon, 224 pages, Rebellion, 2025, ISBN 9781837864232 (standard paperback edition), ISBN 9781837865048 (webstore exclusive hardback edition)
  - Volume 4: collects The Two Torquemadas (Book 7), Purity's Story (Book 8), Deathbringer (Book 9) and Warlocks and Wizards, 192 pages, Rebellion, 2025, ISBN 9781837865659 (standard paperback edition), ISBN 9781837867066 (webstore exclusive hardback edition)
  - Volume 5: collects Nemesis and Deadlock: The Enigmass Variations, Bride of Warlock, Shape of Things to Come, The Tomb of Torquemada, Hammer of Warlocks, The Final Conflict (Book 10), Deadlock and Tubular Hells, 240 pages, Rebellion, 2026, ISBN 9781837866618 (standard paperback edition), ISBN 9781837866878 (webstore exclusive hardback edition)

== In other media ==
=== Computer games ===
Nemesis the Warlock: The Death of Torquemada was released as a game made for the Commodore 64, Amstrad CPC and ZX Spectrum. The C64 version of this game was made by Martech in 1987, programmer Michael J. Archer, and musician Rob Hubbard.

=== Music video ===
The video for Shriekback's 1985 single "Nemesis" from the album Oil & Gold features Nemesis the Warlock.

=== Toys and games ===
Wizkids / NECA have released three figures of Nemesis the Warlock as part of their Heroclix collectable miniatures game (Rookie, Experienced and Veteran versions). These were only released in the United Kingdom, alongside other 2000AD related figures, as part of the "Indy" expansion to the game. This led to something of an outcry from the American fans of both the game and the character, and this style of "regional" figure-release was not continued in later sets of Heroclix.
