= Angela Kincaid =

British illustrator

- Area: Artist
- Pseudonym: Angie Mills

Angela Kincaid, formerly known by her married name of Angela Mills, is a children's book illustrator best known for The Butterfly Children series of picture books. In 1983, with her then husband, Pat Mills, she created the Celtic comics character Sláine for 2000 AD.
