= Pat Mills =

English comics writer and editor (born 1949)

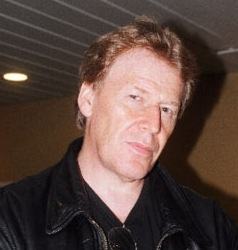
- Pat Mills in 2003
- Born: Patrick Eamon Mills; March 7, 1949 (age 77) England
- Areas: Writer, Editor
- Notable works: Sláine; Charley's War; ABC Warriors; Nemesis the Warlock; Requiem Vampire Knight

Patrick Eamon Mills (born 1949) is an English comics writer and editor who, along with John Wagner, revitalised British boys' comics in the 1970s, and has remained a leading light in British comics ever since. He has been called "the godfather of British comics".

His comics are notable for their violence and anti-authoritarianism. He is best known for creating 2000 AD and playing a major part in the development of Judge Dredd.

== Biography ==
Mills started his career as a sub-editor for D. C. Thomson & Co. Ltd, where he met Wagner. In 1971 both left to go freelance, and were soon writing scripts for IPC's girls' and humour comics. After D.C. Thomson launched Warlord, a successful war-themed weekly, Mills was asked in 1975 to develop a rival title for IPC. Based in the girls' comics department to avoid the attention of the staff of the boys' department, Mills, along with Wagner and Gerry Finley-Day, worked in secret to create Battle Picture Weekly. Battle's stories were more violent and its characters more working class than IPC's traditional fare, and it was an immediate hit. Having made the comic ready for launch, Mills resigned as editor. He would later write the celebrated First World War series Charley's War, drawn by Joe Colquhoun, for the title.

After launching Battle, Mills began developing a new boys' title, Action, launched in 1976. Action's mix of violence and anti-authoritarianism proved controversial and the title lasted less than a year before being withdrawn in the face of media protests. It was briefly revived in neutered form before being merged into Battle.

His next creation was the science fiction-themed weekly 2000 AD, launched in 1977. As with Battle and Action he developed most of the early series before handing them over to other writers. He took over the development of Judge Dredd when creator John Wagner temporarily walked out, and wrote many of the early stories, establishing the character and his world, before Wagner returned.

In 1978 IPC launched Starlord, a short-lived companion title for 2000 AD. Mills contributed Ro-Busters, a series about a robot disaster squad, which moved to 2000 AD when Starlord was cancelled. Ro-Busters was the beginning of a mini-universe of interrelated stories Mills was to create for 2000 AD, including ABC Warriors and Nemesis the Warlock. Artist Kevin O'Neill was involved in the creation of all three. Another strand of his 2000 AD work was Sláine, a barbarian fantasy based on Celtic mythology and neo-paganism, which he co-created with his then wife Angela Kincaid (with whom he also created the children's series of books, The Butterfly Children).

Mills also had a hand in IPC's line of comics aimed at girls, such as Chiller (a horror comic), Misty (supernatural stories) and Jinty (science fiction).

In 1986 he edited the short-lived comic Diceman, which featured characters from 2000 AD in political satire regarding U.S. President Ronald Reagan. Mills wrote nearly every story.

In 1988 he was involved in the launch of Crisis, a politically aware 2000 AD spin-off aimed at older readers. For it he wrote Third World War, drawn initially by Carlos Ezquerra. The title lasted until 1991 and launched the careers of talents such as Garth Ennis, John Smith and Sean Phillips.

In 1991 Mills launched Toxic!, an independent colour newsstand weekly comic with a violent, anarchic tone, perhaps as a reaction against the politically worthy Crisis, and a creator-owned ideal. Many of the stories were created by Mills and co-writer Tony Skinner, including Accident Man, an assassin who makes his hits look like accidents. Toxic! lasted less than a year, but gave a start to talents such as Duke Mighten and Martin Emond.

He has had little success in American comics, with the exception of Metalzoic and Marshal Law, published by DC and Epic comics respectively in the late 1980s, both drawn by O'Neill. Mills' Toxic strips Accident Man and Brats Bizarre were reprinted as their own US-format titles (by Dark Horse Comics and Epic, respectively) and Mills wrote Punisher 2099 for Marvel, Zombie World for Dark Horse, and Death Race 2020 (reuniting Mills with Kevin O'Neill) for Roger Corman's Cosmic Comics.

In 1995, he broke into the French market, one of his life's goals, with Sha, created with French artist Olivier Ledroit.

He continues to write Sláine, Bill Savage, Black Siddha and ABC Warriors for 2000 AD, and also the Franco-Belgian comic Requiem Vampire Knight, with art by Olivier Ledroit, and its spin-off Claudia Chevalier Vampire, with art by Franck Tacito.

Two new series, Greysuit, a super-powered government agent drawn by John Higgins, and Defoe, a 17th-century zombie hunter drawn by Leigh Gallagher, began in 2000 AD prog 1540.

Mills has formed Repeat Offenders with artist Clint Langley and Jeremy Davis "to develop graphic novel concepts with big-screen potential" and the first project is a graphic novel called American Reaper, serialised in the Judge Dredd Megazine (2011–2015). It has been optioned by Trudie Styler's Xingu Films and Mills has written the screenplay.

He has also written two Doctor Who audio plays, "Dead London" (2008) and "The Scapegoat" (2009) for Big Finish Productions, featuring the Eighth Doctor and Lucie Miller. The first audio play was released as the first part of the second season of the Eighth Doctor Adventures and the second as part of the third season. In 2010 Mills adapted a story that had been started by him and Wagner for Doctor Who in the 1980s and was produced by Big Finish as "The Song of Megaptera". In 2023, a 1980 Fourth Doctor comic he penned (with artist Dave Gibbons) for Doctor Who Magazine was adapted into the Fourteenth Doctor special "The Star Beast."

In 2017 he wrote, with Kevin O'Neill, and published two novels, Serial Killer and Goodnight, John-Boy, part of a planned series of four books. Also in that year, he published his memoirs, Be Pure! Be Vigilant! Behave! 2000 AD and Judge Dredd: The Secret History in print and as an e-book. Mills also narrated the audiobook version himself. (The title is the catchphrase of the villain in his series Nemesis the Warlock.)

In 2018 the film Accident Man was released, based on his comic strip for Toxic!

In 2019 Mills announced that he would publish a new all-ages science fiction anthology comic called Spacewarp, to be released in 2020, and that the artists would retain the copyright on their work.

In 2021 he published another volume of memoirs with a focus on Slaine, Kiss My Axe! Slaine the Warped Warrior: The Secret History.

== Bibliography ==
As well as his influential role in creating and contributing to numerous of British comics, Mills has produced work in both America and Europe.

Preceded by –	2000 AD editor 1977	Succeeded by Kelvin Gosnell
