= Nic Sadler =

British cinematographer

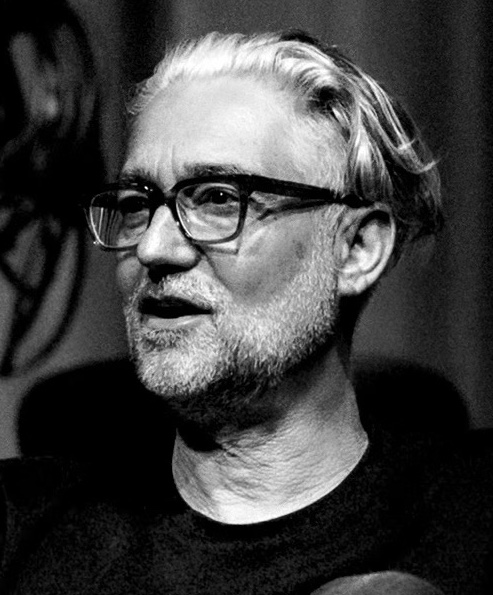
- Nic Sadler talking at CSUN
- Born: Nicholas John Sadler; 24 May 1965 (age 61); London, England
- Occupations: Cinematographer, Inventor & Photographer
- Years active: 1987–present
- Website: nicsadler.com

Nic Sadler is a British/Australian cinematographer, photographer and inventor, living in Los Angeles.

== Early life ==
Sadler was born in East London in May 1965, to an Anglo-Indian mother and a British-Roma father. His mother Elizabeth "Betty" King emigrated from India in 1956 with her mother Mavis, siblings Aubrey and Angela "Angie" King, shortly after their father died in Madras. At age seven he moved with his parent to Perth, Western Australia.

While at North Lake Senior High School he developed an interest in photography from Daniel, his photolithographer father, supported by then teacher at NLSH, John Longley (a future crew member of the successful 1980 America's Cup challenger, Freedom).

Sadler graduated with a Bachelor of Arts degree from WAIT (Western Australian Institute of Technology), later known as Curtin University, in Perth in 1985, studying under filmmakers Bill Constable and Steve Jodrell, and renown cultural theorists John Fiske and John Hartley.

== Cinematographer ==
Sadler began working in the film industry in 1986 as a production assistant on the film Shame, directed his former tutor Steve Jodrell; then on the martial arts films Day of the Panther and Strike of the Panther.

In 1987 he worked as 2nd assistant camera on television film A Waltz Through the Hills,. The following year he worked as second unit 1st assistant camera on Australian miniseries Jackaroo.

After moving to London in 1989, Sadler began working primarily as 1st assistant camera to John Mathieson BSC, then a popular music video cinematographer, for artists including U2, Sinéad O'Connor and Prince

By 1992 Sadler had begun working as a cinematographer, shooting music videos for artists including Elbow, The Prodigy, Echo & the Bunnymen, Supertramp and Ocean Colour Scene. He worked extensively with Spidercom Films with directors Alex De Rakoff and David Slade while Guy Ritchie was an in-house director.

In 1997 he shot Nick Cave's The Boatman's Call, a concert film in the MTV Live'n'Loud series. for director Nick Wickham; then on concerts for R.E.M., The Corrs, Norah Jones, Mumford & Sons and others

He shot numerous television commercials over a 20 year period for brands including Coca Cola, De Beers, Axe and Samsung, including an award winning for Peugeot featuring the magician David Blaine in 2000.

In 2000 he began shooting short films for commercials directors Peter Lydon and James Wood. In 2002 he shot Me, You and the Dead for Director Rick Griffiths, who worked as a grip for Sadler while shooting commercials in Manchester. The film won the Audience Award at the Commonwealth Film Festival in 2002.

He shot his first television drama, Paren't Night from the series Shockers, for director Marc Charach and producer Barney Reisz in 2000.

By 2004 Sadler had begun working with live TV director Hamish Hamilton, first on a concert film for Norah Jones, then on four Victoria's Secret Fashion Show TV specials. The last of these, the Victoria's Secret Swim Special, featured Maroon 5 performing Animals on Vieques in Puerto Rico.

After moving to Los Angeles in 2004, he shot the low budget independent film Intellectual Property, which went on to win Best Cinematography at the 2006 Australian International Film Festival.

In 2011 he shot Tales of the Code: Wedlocked directed by James Byrkit. a prequel featurette to the first Pirates of the Caribbean film. In 2013 he collaborated again with Byrkit on the ultra-low budget cult film Coherence. Shot over five nights for under $50,000, Coherence is listed as one of the "150 Essential Sci-Fi Movies to Watch Now" by Rotten Tomatoes.

== Photographer ==
In 2014 Sadler began a creative photographic partnership with Julia Sandberg Hansson under the name SHSadler. Working closely with LA Make-up artist Satya Linak, their award winning work has been widely published in art magazines and journals.

A series of pictures by SHSadler of Daft Punk were published by Triple J Magazine in May 2013, as part of the promotion for Random Access Memories.

The Fresh Meat series of pictures began as an editorial commission about make-up, morphing into a commentary about cultural beauty standards. It was rejected by the commissioner then published in their sister magazine Schön!. In 2020 the images won Gold and 1st Place prizes at the TIFA (Tokyo International Foto Awards).

In 2025 the Bad Wolfy image from the Fresh Meat series was used on the cover of Phoebe Stuckes novel Dead Animals. Images from Fresh Meat were used in the French art text book Instants Français.

The Fresh Meat images have been referenced numerous times in popular culture, including music videos for Middle Child by J Cole and Gnarly by Katseye, a poster for the movie Fresh, in promotion and in the set design of the tv show Comedy Central Roast - Netherlands and in unlicensed merchandizing by the influencer Emma Chamberlain.

== Inventor ==
Sadler formed the company Chemical Wedding in 2007 with Toby Evetts and Simon Reeves, to produce software tools for filmmakers on the newly established iOS platform. Helios, an early Apple iOS application for filmmakers to pre-visualise the effect of sunlight on locations and people, was released in 2008. This was followed by the release of Artemis Digital Directors Viewfinder in 2009, the first digital directors viewfinder on a mobile phone platform.

In 2016 Chemical Wedding began production of the Artemis Prime, a hybrid hardware / digital director's Lens finder system. The system is in wide use, notably by camera operator Jim McConkey with cinematographer David Mullen on the television series The Marvelous Mrs. Maisel.

Sadler & his partners at Chemical Wedding were awarded both an Emmy and the British Society of Cinematographers Bert Easey awards for the development of Artemis and Helios.

From 2017 to 2024 Sadler was Consultant to Caldwell, an optics company based in Glendale, California, in their production of the Chameleon Anamorphic motion picture lenses, used on the production on The Mandalorian from Disney Studios.

== Podcasts ==
From February 2014 until June 2018 Nic was a co-host on over 200 episodes of the political podcast From the Bunker with Richard Beatty, David Schockett and Jody Hamilton. Jody (the youngest daughter of Carol Burnett) is currently Executive Producer of the Stephanie Miller Show.

Sadler has featured on several podcasts as a guest, including Movies We Like and Film Salon

== Public Speaking ==
Sadler lectures in Cinematography at numerous institutions, including the American Film Institute, CSUN, and UC Santa Barbara. He also speaks regularly at film festivals and trade shows about cinematography, technology and the future of filmmaking.

== Filmography ==
=== Short films ===
Year	Title	Director	Notes
2001	Dumping Elaine	Peter Lydon	
2002	Monday, Tuesday, Wednesday	James Wood	
2002	Me, You and the Dead	Rick Griffiths	
2003	White Bits	Alexander Jovy	
2003	The Silent Treatment	Peter Lydon	
2005	Snaps	Simon Lewis	
2005	Maroon 5: Not Coming Home	Zack Stoff	
2005	Maroon 5: Thoughts About Jane	Zack Stoff	
2007	Hell Bent for Leather	James Wood	
2008	Ride the Wake	Jennifer Akana Sturla	
2008	Cinco de Mayo	Giles Greenwood	
2011	Journey to Safety	Varda Bar-Ku	
2011	Tales of the Code: Wedlocked	James Byrkit	
2013	Not Alone	Trish Sie	
2015	First Impressions	Jay Riedl	

=== Feature films ===
Year	Title	Director
2001	Buffalo Soldiers – Second unit Cinematographer	Gregor Jordan
2004	Trauma – Additional Cinematography	Marc Evans
2004	Spivs – Second unit Cinematographer	Colin Teague
2006	Intellectual Property / Dark Mind	Nicholas Peterson
2013	Coherence	James Byrkit
2013	Cavemen	Herschel Faber
2013	Forgive Us	Antony Haden-West
2020	One More Orbit – Mauritius Unit	Terry Virts

=== Television ===
Year	Title	Director	Notes
1994	MTV Rocumentary Series: Reggaementary	Nick Wickham	Episode shot in Jamaica, NYC & London
1995	Gamesmaster	Steve Wright	Season 4 - 18 Episodes
1998	Coming Home	Giles Foster	Two part miniseries
2000	Shockers: Parent's Night	Marc Charach	Season 2, Episode 2
2005	Victoria's Secret Fashion Show 2005	Hamish Hamilton	Lexington Avenue Armory, New York City
2011	Brain Games: Pay Attention!	Jeremiah Crowell	Season 1, Episode 2
2013	Victoria's Secret Fashion Show 2013	Hamish Hamilton	Lexington Avenue Armory, New York City
2014	Victoria's Secret Fashion Show 2014	Hamish Hamilton	Earls Court Exhibition Centre, London
2015	Victoria's Secret Swim Special	Hamish Hamilton	TV Special, Puerto Rico

=== Music videos (partial list) ===
Year	Band	Title	Director
1992	Revolver	Cradle Snatch	Tom Merilion
1992	The Prodigy	Fire	Russel Curtis
1994	Sleeper	Delicious	James Brett
1994	Shed Seven	Speakeasy	Alex Szaszy
1994	Chris Rea	You Can Go Your Own Way	David Parvin
1995	Caroline Henderson	Kiss Me, Kiss Me	Pascal d'Hoeraene
1996	Dreadzone	Little Britain	David Slade
1996	Lighthouse Family	Goodbye Heartbreak	Norman Watson
1997	Travis	Happy	Nick Wickham
1997	Echo & the Bunnymen	Nothing Lasts Forever	Norman Watson
1997	Supertramp	Listen To Me Please	Vincent Soyez
1997	Dreadzone	Moving On	David Slade
1997	Ocean Color Scene	Better Day	Tony Briggs
1997	Ollano feat. Helena Noguerra	Latitudes	Pascal d'Hoeraene
1998	Sting & Aswad	Invisible Sun	Feasible Films
2000	Beautiful South	Closer Than Most	Liam & Grant
2001	Elbow (band)	Powder Blue	Scott Weintrob
2005	Ocean Color Scene	Free My Name	Giles Greenwood
2009	Thriving Ivory	Hey Lady	Kevin McVey
2012	Meg Myers	Curbstomp	Trish Sie

=== Concert films ===
Year	Band	Title	Director
1997	Nick Cave & The Bad Seeds	MTV Live 'n' Loud - The Boatman's Call	Nick Wickham
1998	REM	Uptake	Nick Wickham
1999	The Corrs	MTV Unplugged	Nick Wickham
2004	Norah Jones & the Handsome Band	Live in 2004	Hamish Hamilton
2005	Maroon 5	Friday the 13th - Live at the Santa Barbara Bowl	Russel Thomas
2013	Mumford & Sons	Live from the Artists Den	Natalie Johns
2013	Soundgarden	Live from the Artists Den	Jojo Pennebaker
2014	Sara Bareilles	Live from the Artists Den	Kurt E. Soderling
2014	Fitz and the Tantrums	Live from the Artists Den	Torre Catalano
2018	Jennifer Lopez	All I Have	Sam Wrench

== Photography ==
in partnership with Julia Sandberg-Hansson as SHSadler

Year	Publication	Article
2013	Triple J magazine	Daft Punk
2018	Plain	Fresh Meat
2018	Schön!	Beauty Standards Revisited
2019	It's Nice That	SHSadler's Fresh Meat assesses the line between “what is beautiful and what is ugly”
2019	DesignBoom	Plastic wrapped and ready to deconstruct beauty standards in the age of selfies
2020	VoyageLA	Meet SHSadler
2020	Lens Culture	Fresh Meat
2021	Instants Francaise	SH/SADLER, Fresh Meat
2022	Schön!	i scream
2022	Lens Culture	Fresh Meat
2025	Acumen	SHSadler: A Sharp Eye on Beauty

== Awards ==
Australian International Film Festival

Year	Award	Category	Title	Result
2006	Silver Spotlight Award	Best Cinematography	Intellectual Property	Won

Emmy Awards

Year	Category	For	Notes
2018	Outstanding Achievement in Engineering Development	The Artemis Digital Directors Viewfinder System	With Toby Evetts and Simon Reeves; Partners in Chemical Wedding

Tokyo International Photo Award

Year	Title	Category	Result
2020	Fresh Meat	TIFA Beauty Photography	Gold
2020	Fresh Meat	TIFA Advertising Photography	1st Place

British Society of Cinematographers (BSC) Awards

Year	For	Category
2024	Artemis Pro & Helios Pro	BSC Bert Easey Technical Award
