= Julia Sandberg Hansson =

Swedish actress

- Born: Julia Sandberg-Hansson; Stockholm, Sweden
- Occupations: Producer, director, editor, actor, photographer
- Years active: 1993–present
- Website: Julia Shoots

Julia Sandberg Hansson is a Swedish American artist living and working in Los Angeles.

== Early life and education ==
Hansson was born on September 2, 1983 in Stockholm, Sweden, the daughter of Claudia Sandberg Hansson and Janne Hansson, who co-owned the renowned Atlantis Studios until 2020. Atlantis is where the early ABBA recording were made, prior to the formation of the group, as well as the majority of their hit singles, and recordings by The Cardigans, Roxette, Opeth, and The Hives.

Hansson pursued her undergraduate studies at Central Saint Martins College of Art and Design in London, where she earned a bachelor's degree in Fine Art, specializing in film, video, and performance. This program provided foundational training in experimental media practices, emphasizing creative storytelling through visual and performative elements.

She continued her graduate education at the Slade School of Fine Art, University College London, obtaining a master's degree in Fine Art with a focus on film, video, and performance.

At Slade, Hansson developed key projects that explored narrative improvisation and multimedia techniques, such as "Exchange Square" (2006), a 11-minute digital video featuring two actors using mobile phones and hands-free devices in a scriptless performance. Other notable works from this period include "The Stomach Cancer Auditions" (2006), a 13-minute digital video documenting improvised death scenes by actors under false pretenses; and "The Way Out is Through" (2007), a 25-minute comedic video set in an isolated office environment.

== Professional career ==
=== Actor ===
Hansson made her acting debut in the 2007 film Postal, directed by Uwe Boll, playing the character Mitzi in a scene involving a shooting. This followed with a role in the short film Delirium Dance (2007), featuring experimental performances by artists. She appeared as Olga in the 2008 film The Kreutzer Sonata, adapted from Leo Tolstoy's novella and directed by Bernard Rose.

Hansson had supporting roles in the early 2010s, playing Julia the Mask Dancer in the comedy Showgirls 2: Penny's from Heaven (2011), a satirical sequel directed by Jim Wynorski. In 2012, she took on the role of Tara in Junkie, a film exploring themes of addiction, directed by Adam Mason. She played Krista in the 2013 road movie Bruno & Earlene Go to Vegas, directed by Simon Savory, which follows two transgender individuals on a journey across America.

Later credits include the Icelandic thriller Brave Men's Blood (2014), where Hansson appeared as Julia in a story centered on police corruption, directed by Olaf de Fleur.

=== Producer ===
Hansson served as a producer on London Calling (2025), directed by Allan Ungar, collaborating with producers Delon Bakker and Kyle Ambrose. She was co-producer of the film Junkie (2012).

=== Editor ===
Hansson worked as editor on several projects, including the feature film Charlie Valentine (2009), directed by Jesse Johnson, and The Original 7ven Formerly Known as the Time (2011).

=== Director ===
Hansson has directed several short films, including Pillow Talk (2009), Love Story (2012). and The Blind Productions Project.

=== Photographer ===
In 2014, Sadler began a creative photographic partnership with Nic Sadler under the name SHSadler. Working closely with Los Angeles make-up artist Satya Linak, their award-winning work has been widely published in art magazines and journals.

A series of pictures by SHSadler of Daft Punk were published by Triple J Magazine in May 2013, as part of a promotion for Random Access Memories.

The "Fresh Meat" series of pictures began as an editorial commission about makeup, morphing into a commentary about cultural beauty standards. It was rejected by the commissioner, then published in their sister magazine, Schön!. In 2020, the images won Gold and 1st Place prizes at the TIFA (Tokyo International Foto Awards).

In 2025, the "Bad Wolfy" image from the Fresh Meat series was used on the cover of Phoebe Stuckes' novel Dead Animals. Images from Fresh Meat were used in the French art text book Instants Français.

The Fresh Meat images have been referenced numerous times in popular culture, including music videos for "Middle Child" by J. Cole and "Gnarly" by Katseye, a poster for the movie Fresh, in promotion and in the set design of the tv show Comedy Central Roast - Netherlands and in merchandizing by the influencer Emma Chamberlain.
