= Debt Collector (disambiguation) =

A debt collector works for a collection agency.

Debt Collector or The Debt Collector may also refer to:

- The Debt Collector, 1970 novel by Stanley Morgan
- "The Debt Collector", story by Maurice Levin, basis for the 1931 early sound short Gaunt with Ralph Lewis
- The Debt Collector (1999 film), a thriller written and directed by Anthony Neilson
- "The Debt Collector", a song by Blur from the album Parklife, 1994
- "Debt Collector", a song by Rose's Pawn Shop from Dancing On the Gallows, 2010
- The Debt Collector (2018 film), an action-comedy film starring Scott Adkins
- Debt Collectors (film), 2020 American film
