= Emer Patten =

Irish music producer

Emer Patten is an Irish film producer of primarily live music performances.

== Career ==
In 1997 Patten co-founded boutique film production company Splinter Films - with long-term business partner Nick Wickham - where she works as Executive Producer, covering live events on multiple platforms including cinema, TV, 3D, DVD and online digital.

She previously worked for MTV Europe and has worked extensively with some of the world's best-known musical artists, including Madonna, Rihanna, Beyoncé, Metallica, Foo Fighters, The Cure, Katy Perry and Red Hot Chili Peppers. As well as her experience with major rock, pop and indie acts she has also produced films for many big-name Latin music artists in recent years, resulting in two Latin Grammy nominations for Best Long Form Music Video; once in 2012 for her work with Shakira and then again in 2014 for her work with Carlos Santana

Patten was invited back to her former university, Dublin City University, to give a TEDx talk in 2014, speaking on the topics of music film-making and activism, her presentation was titled 'A Passionate Engagement, When Music Film-making & Activism Overlap'. During this talk, Patten also touched upon her influences and drive to use her expertise in the music industry to engage in activism and political issues through her early associations with charities such as War Child & Greenpeace and events including Chime for Change and Live 8.

== Production credits ==
Year	Production	Role
2015	Narendra Modi – UK Welcomes Modi, Live from Wembley Stadium	Broadcast Producer
2015	The Who – Live in Hyde Park	Producer
2015	Roberto Carlos – Primera Fila - Abbey Road Studios, London	Producer
2014	Carlos Santana - Corazón: Live from Mexico: Live It to Believe It	Producer
2014	Imagine Dragons – Transformers: Age of Extinction Premiere - Hong Kong	Producer
2013	Joe Cocker: Fire It Up Live	Producer
2013	Muse - World War Z World Premiere - London	Producer
2013	The Sound of Change Live / Chime for Change	Broadcast Producer
2012	Rihanna: Loud Tour Live at the 02	Producer
2012	Katy Perry: Part of Me	Producer
2011	Shakira: Live from Paris	Producer
2011	JLS: Eyes Wide Open 3D	Executive Producer
2011	Linkin Park - Transformers: Dark of the Moon - World Premiere Special	Producer
2011	Red Hot Chili Peppers: I'm with You Live in Theatres	Producer
2011	Il Divo - Live in London	Producer
2010	Sia: Clap Your Hands 3D	Producer
2010	Metallica/Slayer/Megadeth/Anthrax: The Big 4 - Live from Sofia Bulgaria	Executive Producer
2010	The Snowman: The Live Stage Show	Producer
2010	JLS: Only Tonight - Live from London	Executive Producer
2010	Ivete Sangalo - Multishow ao Vivo: Ivete Sangalo 20 Anos	Producer
2009	Kings of Leon: Live at The O2 London, England	Producer
2009	Beyoncé - I am... Yours. An Intimate Performance at Wynn Las Vegas	Producer
2009	An Evening with 'Il Divo: Live in Barcelona	Producer
2008	Backstreet Boys: Live from O2 Arena	Producer
2008	Alanis Morissette: Live from Carling Brixton Academy	Producer
2008	Foo Fighters: Live at Wembley Stadium	Producer
2008	Linkin Park: Road Revolution (Live at Milton Keynes)	Producer
2007	The Pussycat Dolls: Live from Manchester Evening News Arena	Producer
2007	Mika: Live from Koko	Producer
2007	Kings of Leon: Live from the Hammersmith Apollo	Producer
2007	Shakira Oral Fixation Tour 2007	Producer
2007	The Beyoncé Experience: Live	Producer
2006	Depeche Mode: Touring the Angel - Live in Milan	Producer
2006	Natasha Bedingfield: 'Live in New York City'	Producer
2006	MSN Music in Concert	Producer - 1 Episode
2006	Foo Fighters: Skin and Bones Live in Hyde Park	Producer
2006	Black Eyed Peas: Live from Sydney to Vegas	Producer
2005	Morrissey: Who Put the M in Manchester	Producer
2005	Live 8	Supervising Producer: MTV USA & MTV International
2005	Il Divo: Encore	Producer
2003	The Cure: Trilogy	Producer
2003	Red Hot Chili Peppers: Live at Slane Castle	Producer
