= Legacy of Lies =

- Poster
- Directed by: Adrian Bol
- Written by: Adrian Bol
- Produced by: Alla Belaya; Krzysztof Solek; Adrian Bol
- Starring: Scott Adkins; Anna Butkevich; Honor Kneafsey; Matt Mitler; Yuliia Sobol Andrea Vasiliou; Martin McDougall
- Cinematography: Simon Rowling
- Edited by: Yuri Reznichenko
- Music by: Arkadiusz Reikowski
- Distributed by: Toy Cinema; Film & TV House; GEM Entertainment
- Release dates: July 28, 2020 (United States); October 28, 2020 (United Kingdom)
- Running time: 101 minutes
- Countries: United States; United Kingdom
- Language: English
- Budget: $4.5 Million
- Box office: $94,583

Legacy of Lies is a 2020 film written and directed by Adrian Bol and starring Scott Adkins.

== Plot ==
A decade ago, agent Martin Baxter quit MI6 after his wife's tragic murder in an operation gone wrong. But when journalist Sasha asks for help solving an old case, Martin finds himself in the crosshairs of both UK and Russian intelligence. With his daughter held captive by the KGB, Martin has just 24 hours to deliver the secret case files — which means risking both Sasha's life and his own.

== Cast ==
- Scott Adkins as Martin Baxter
- Anna Butkevich as Tatyana
- Yuliia Sobol as Sasha Stepanenko
- Honor Kneafsey as Lisa Baxter
- Andrea Vasiliou as Suzanne
- Martin McDougall as Trevor

== Background ==
The film was shot in London and Kyiv.

Post-production finished in December 2019, though due to the COVID-19 pandemic, Legacy of Lies could not be premiered in theatres.

The movie was held back from release until February 2021, when the rights were sold to Netflix UK. The film reached number four in the charts and stayed there for many weeks. In October 2021, Netflix USA bought the rights and the film debuted at number two.
