= Nick Wickham =

British film and television director

Nick Wickham is a British film and television director specialising in live performance, beginning his career in music and fashion by shooting and directing shows and on air presentations at MTV Europe. In 1997 he moved on to establish boutique film production company Splinter Films with Producer Emer Patten, where he worked as a multi camera director for live events on multiple platforms including cinema, TV, 3D, DVD and online digital streaming, before going freelance in 2017. He has worked extensively with some of the world's best-known musical artists, creating concert films for Madonna, Rihanna, Beyoncé, Metallica, Foo Fighters, The Cure, Katy Perry and Red Hot Chili Peppers as well as major Latin music artists such as Shakira, Carlos Santana, Alejandro Sanz and Ivete Sangalo.

Wickham is also a multi camera director for the National Theatre for the National Theatre Live series of live streams to cinema. Work includes A Streetcar Named Desire with Gillian Anderson, Ivo van Hove's production of A View from the Bridge with Mark Strong, Théâtre de Complicité's A Disappearing Number and the original production of The Curious Incident of the Dog in the Night-Time from the Young Vic.

Also made for cinema, with BBC Music and BBC Learning, are the groundbreaking classical music films Ten Pieces & Ten Pieces II, that have helped to establish a music curriculum for British primary and secondary schools.

Wickham's long form work has been nominated twice for a Latin Grammy, in addition to winning the award for Best Director (TV/DVD) at the 2006 CAD awards and best director at the TPi awards. In 2013, Katy Perry: Part of Me was awarded Best 3D Live Event at the 4th Annual Creative Arts Awards. Wickham's work for BBC Ten Pieces won a BAFTA in 2016 British Academy Children's Award.

== Recent directorial credits ==
Year	Production	Role
2020	Eagles – Live from the Forum MMXVIII	Director
2019	The Cure 40	Director
2019	National Theatre Live – All About Eve	Director
2019	Alejandro Sanz – # La Gira [Live at Wanda Stadium, Madrid]	Director
2018	Norah Jones Live At Ronnie Scott's	Director
2017	Messiah from Bristol Old Vic	Director
2017	Alejandro Sanz – + Es + – Live In Madrid	Director
2017	National Theatre Live – Hedda Gabler	Director
2017	Marc Anthony Half Time special – Live In Miami	Director
2017	G.E.M. - G-Force - Music Documentary	Director
2015	National Theatre Live – A View From the Bridge	Director
2015	National Theatre Live – Everyman	Director
2014 & 2015	BBC – Ten Pieces & Ten Pieces Secondary	Director
2015	UK Welcomes Modi – Live International Broadcast from Wembley Stadium	Director
2014	Carlos Santana – Corazón: Live from Mexico: Live It to Believe It	Director
2014	Imagine Dragons – Transformers: Age of Extinction Premiere - Hong Kong	Director
2014	Alejandro Fernández – Confidencias Reales	Director
2014	National Theatre Live – A Streetcar Named Desire (live cinema broadcast)	Director
2014	Ivete Sangalo – Multishow ao Vivo: Ivete Sangalo 20 Anos	Director
2013	Joe Cocker: Fire It Up Live	Director
2013	Alejandro Sanz – La Música No Se Toca	Director
2012	National Theatre Live – The Curious Incident of the Dog in the Night-Time	Director
2012	Rihanna – Loud Tour Live at the O2	Director
2012	Katy Perry – Part of Me	Director

== Notable earlier directorial credits ==
- Red Hot Chili Peppers – Live at Slane Castle
- Shakira Live From Paris
- Foo Fighters Live at Wembley Stadium
- The Big 4 Live From Sofia, Bulgaria
- Madonna Sticky & Sweet Tour
- Beyoncé – I Am... Yours (Wynn Las Vegas)
- The Corrs – MTV Unplugged
- R.E.M. – This Way Up
- The Cure – Trilogy
