= Avengement =

2019 action film by Jesse V. Johnson

- Theatrical release poster
- Directed by: Jesse V. Johnson
- Written by: Jesse V. Johnson; Stu Small
- Produced by: Ehud Bleiberg; Joe Karimi-Nik
- Starring: Scott Adkins; Craig Fairbrass; Thomas Turgoose
- Cinematography: Jonathan Hall
- Edited by: Matthew Lorentz
- Music by: Sean Murray
- Production company: Compound B
- Distributed by: Spirit Entertainment
- Release date: 24 May 2019
- Running time: 88 minutes
- Country: United Kingdom
- Language: English

Avengement is a 2019 British action thriller film directed by Jesse V. Johnson who co-wrote the film with Stu Small. The film stars Scott Adkins, Craig Fairbrass and Thomas Turgoose.

Avengement was released on 24 May 2019 on VOD and in selected theatres, where it received generally positive reviews from critics with praise for its action choreography and Adkins' performance. In 2020, a special edition was released, which contains an uncut version of the film.

== Plot ==
Cain Burgess is a prisoner who is being escorted by police to a hospital where he learns of his mother's death. After seeing her corpse, Cain escapes and then visits a private bar, entering it by attacking the bouncers. While having his drink, Cain overhears one of the patrons named Tune describing how an unknown assailant killed a fellow gangster named Rook. Cain intervenes with his laughter, only to invite the wrath of Tune, his fellow patrons, and barmaid Bez. Cain claims himself to be a friend of the bar owner named Lincoln and gets into a brawl, where he pulls out a double-barrelled sawed-off shotgun and holds everyone hostage. Lincoln's lieutenant Hyde arrives and recognises Cain as Lincoln's younger brother, where he is also held hostage.

One of the patrons trying to intervene is shot in the kneecap by Cain, who blames Hyde and Lincoln for his condition. Cain then starts narrating that he got sent to the notorious London prison HMP Belmarsh and had to fight for survival in prison. It is revealed that Cain used to be a skilled and quick-tempered martial artist who caused Lincoln, a loan shark, and several gangsters to lose substantial amounts of money. Seeking to invest in a legitimate business, Cain comes to Lincoln for financial help, where he is pulled into the world of crime after he is asked to rob a mark who has retrieved a package from one of Lincoln's gangsters. Cain succeeds in stealing the package from a middle-aged woman who pursues him and gets killed when she is run over by an oncoming car during the chase.

Cain is arrested and charged with manslaughter. Detective O'Hara explains that Lincoln's scam baits marks them into acting as a bagman to forgive their debts. Lincoln arranges for someone to steal the bag, causing the target to owe Lincoln even more money than before. When Cain refuses to cooperate with the police, Sgt. Evans handcuffs him and beats him up. Despite his clean record, Cain is sentenced to England's most violent prison, Belmarsh, where he gets into several fights and sustains severe injuries. Despite fighting in self-defence, Cain's sentence is repeatedly extended, and this prompts him to become a cold-blooded killer to survive. After several years, one of Cain's attackers reveals Lincoln has put a £20,000 bounty on his head. O'Hara, who has since learned about the bounty, once again asks Cain to give up his brother.

Cain agrees on the condition that he will be allowed to visit his dying mother at a hospital, but is too late as Cain misses his chance and escapes custody after violently beating the police officers who delayed his visit. By night, Lincoln arrives and is similarly threatened by Cain. Lincoln appeals to Cain's better nature, not realising the changes he has been forced to undergo. Hyde mocks Cain and insults the people they conned, prompting Cain to shoot and kill Hyde. Realising that Cain has changed, Lincoln drops his pretences and admits to ordering a hit. Cain angrily tells that he never spoke to the police and that Sgt. Evans admitted to spreading the false rumour before Cain killed him.

After proving that he has emptied Lincoln's bank account, Cain announces that he will kill Lincoln and offers to let everyone else leave. Bez and Lincoln's men attack Cain, but Cain defeats them all, killing most of them, and is stabbed in the process. Although surprised at the viciousness of Cain's vengeance, Lincoln says that he never even cared whether it was true; the real reason he ordered the hit on Cain was that he lost respect either way from just the rumour, which Lincoln could not abide. Lincoln vows to recover and attacks Cain with a knife provided by Bez. Cain eventually overpowers and fatally stabs his brother. He spares Bez and stumbles out of the bar before collapsing on a nearby bench. In his office, Detective O'Hara discovers that Cain divided the £2 million in Lincoln's bank account to his 147 victims.

== Cast ==
- Scott Adkins as Cain Burgess, Lincoln's younger brother
- Craig Fairbrass as Lincoln Burgess,a ruthless crime boss running a cuckooing syndicate
- Thomas Turgoose as "Tune", Lincoln's henchman
- Nick Moran as Hyde, Lincoln's henchman
- Kierston Wareing as "Bez"
- Teresa Mahoney as Mabel Lidell, a victim of Lincoln
- Mark Strange as Clif, Lincoln's pub bouncer
- Leo Gregory as "Mo", Lincoln's henchman
- Luke Lafontaine as Chas, Lincoln's pub bouncer
- Beau Fowler as Vern, Lincoln's henchman
- Dan Styles as Newbold, a police officer
- Christopher Sciueref as Yeates, a police officer
- Matt Routledge as Orderly
- Jane Thorne as Mrs. Burgess, Cain's and Lincoln's mother
- Louis Mandylor as Detective O'Hara
- Ross O'Hennessy as Sergeant Evans, a corrupt sergeant working for Lincoln
- Terence Maynard as Stokes
- Daniel Adegboyega as Rook
- Joe Egan as a prisoner who fights Cain
- Greg Burridge as a prisoner who fights Cain
- Conor Hegarty as Lincoln's henchman
- Michael Higgs as Mr Norton, independent adjudicator
- Damian Gallagher as Randall
- John Ioannou as Albert Mitchell, Lincoln’s victims
- Sofie Golding-Spittle as Doctor
- Darren Swain as Shank
- Lee Charles as Treacle, Lincoln’s henchman
- Dominic Kinnaird as Twang

== Production ==
Avengement is the sixth collaboration between director Jesse V. Johnson and Scott Adkins. Johnson's script was inspired by a 1962 samurai film called Harakiri by director Masaki Kobayashi. Adkins had been looking for a film project based in the United Kingdom and Johnson selected Avengement, one of his older scripts. Stu Small was brought in to rewrite the dialogue and tailor it to Adkins. Stu extensively rewrote the script, and updated older parts of the script. Shortly before filming began Johnson watched a documentary on crime in the UK and used it to add true crime elements to the story.

== Reception ==
On the review aggregator website Rotten Tomatoes, 89% of 18 critics' reviews are positive, with an average rating of 6.5/10. The website's consensus reads: "Avengement compensates for a lack of narrative originality with thrilling sequences of violent, bone-crunching action, elevated by Scott Adkins' brutally intense performance." Metacritic, which uses a weighted average, assigned the film a score of 63 out of 100, based on 5 critics, indicating "generally favorable" reviews.

Chris Nashawaty of Entertainment Weekly wrote: "Director Jesse V. Johnson sprinkles in enough cruel twists of fate and melancholy-laced flashbacks to prevent Avengement from becoming just another disposable exercise in action sadism on a budget. The real credit, though, goes to Adkins, who one of these days will hopefully get called up to the Hollywood big leagues and wind up surprising a lot of people — and grin while he’s doing it." Noel Murray of the Los Angeles Times wrote: "Avengement features a good balance of colorfully profane British gangster-speak and intense, explicitly gory punch-outs." Frank Scheck of The Hollywood Reporter wrote: "Portraying his most complex character to date, Adkins delivers a ferocious turn that proves visceral in its emotional as well as physical intensity."
