= Loud Tour Live at the O2 =

Video by Rihanna
- Released: December 13, 2012
- Recorded: December 20–22, 2011; The O2 Arena (London)
- Genres: Pop; dance; R&B
- Length: 111 minutes
- Labels: SRP; Def Jam
- Director: Nick Wickham
- Producers: Ciarra Pardo; Emer Patten

Rihanna video chronology
Good Girl Gone Bad Live (2008)	Loud Tour Live at the O2 (2012)	Rihanna 777 Documentary (2013)

Loud Tour Live at the O2 is the second live long-form video by Barbadian singer Rihanna. It was released on December 13, 2012, by SRP and Def Jam Recordings. The DVD and Blu-ray Disc release feature her concert at The O2 Arena in London, England as part of the Loud Tour (2011), in support of her fifth studio album Loud (2010). Directed by Nick Wickham and produced by Ciarra Pardo and Emer Patten, it was filmed during the last three shows in London.

The concert consists of five sets including the encore and feature songs from Loud as well as Rihanna's previous albums including Good Girl Gone Bad (2007) and Rated R (2009). Loud Tour Live at the O2 debuted within the top ten on over ten national music video charts. It was most successful in France and Belgium (Wallonia) where the release peaked at number two. On the US Billboard Music Video Sales chart, the album peaked at number 11.

== Background ==
In November 2010, Rihanna released her fifth studio album Loud. Recording sessions for the album began in February 2010 and continued for six months, overlapping with her Last Girl on Earth Tour (2010–11) and filming for her debut feature film Battleship (2012). Rihanna and L.A. Reid assembled a group of songwriters and record producers at several recording studios in Los Angeles for two weeks to write songs for Rihanna; they wrote approximately 200 songs, eleven of which were included on the album. Upon its release, Loud received generally positive reviews from most music critics and earned Rihanna a Grammy Award for Best Dance Recording for the lead single "Only Girl (In the World)". It became a huge commercial success and produced seven singles that attained chart success.

To further promote the album, Rihanna embarked on her third worldwide and fourth overall tour entitled Loud Tour (2011). The tour was officially announced on February 9, 2011, when North American dates were revealed. Critics gave the tour a positive response, with Jon Brean of the Star Tribune noting, "The Barbadian singer is more visually and vocally dynamic than she has ever been before." During an interview with Ryan Seacrest after Rihanna performed "California King Bed" on American Idol, April 14, 2011, the singer spoke about the tour's development. Rihanna addressed rumors about a special performance to be included on the setlist in order to fully incorporate her fans into the experience. When asked by Seacrest about the fan experience, she explained, "Right now, we just designed the stage. I'm really not supposed to say this, but I want to get you excited ... We're building two sections on the stage [for the fans. They'll be] closer than they've ever been. It's real VIP."

== Release ==
Apart from North America, Rihanna also performed two legs in Europe and one in South America. Loud Tour Live at the O2 was filmed at the O2 Arena show in London. During the tour, Rihanna performed 10 shows in London's O2 Arena. Via her official Twitter account, she announced that she was to film the final three outsold shows of the Loud Tour in London (held from December 20–22, 2011) for a live DVD, "Big news Navy! You’ve been begging for it & Rihanna heard you! The last three dates of the LOUD Tour at the O2 in London will be filmed for a concert DVD coming out in 2012 !". On November 19, 2012, Rihanna released her seventh studio album Unapologetic (2012) in both standard and deluxe editions. The deluxe edition of the album contains a special footage from the Loud Tour entitled First Look: Loud Tour Live at the O2 Arena. Rihanna posted the official trailer for the video album on her official YouTube channel, on December 6, 2012. Loud Tour Live at the O2 was released in DVD and Blu-ray formats in Germany on December 14, 2012, and in Portugal and Spain on December 17, 2012 and the following day in Canada, Italy and the United States. The video album was directed by Nick Wickham and produced by Ciarra Pardo and Emer Patten. The editor of the video was Guy Harding.

== Concert synopsis ==
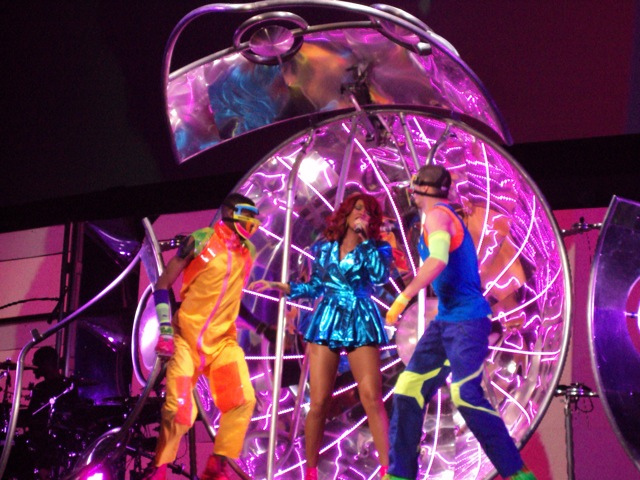
Rihanna performing the opening song "Only Girl (In the World)"

Loud Tour Live at the O2 begins with Rihanna and her team arriving with a ferryboat on a dock. Rihanna continues to walk through and explains how she's feeling very sad and emotional as a result of the Loud Tour ending. The singer starts crying and explains that she and her team have done very good things this year and she believes those things wouldn't happen without the support of her fans. However, now she has to go back to Los Angeles where she doesn't have any friends; her "very best" friends travel with her around the world. Before getting into the van, Rihanna says that the tour was one of her best experiences of her life and talks about how she will miss her fans the upcoming year. Scenes are intercut with the start of the show at The O2 Arena. After the interlude, Rihanna starts the show with the opening song "Only Girl (In the World)". Emerging from a purple ball, the singer performs the song while wearing a blue electric dress and is surrounded by four backup dancers. As "Disturbia" starts she removes the dress and reveals a colorful daisy duke. For the performance of "Shut Up and Drive" a car is present during the scene, to which Rihanna climbs while performing. The set finishes with a rendition of "Man Down".

Scenes are intercut with Rihanna heading to her show in a metro, together with her audience. As she gets into the arena, scenes are intercut and show the singer and her crew preparing for the start of the show and shouting the name of the cities in which they performed. The scenes are again intercut with Rihanna talking about her love towards Miami, and how she moved first in the city when she got signed to the label. Scenes of her and friends taking shots and having fun are further shown. Then, Rihanna explains how the second section of the Loud Tour is called "Le Sex Shoppe"; the director of the tour Jamie King was inspired for creating the section after he saw online the pictures of the singer visiting a sex shop in Australia. A scene of an early rehearsal for the tour is also shown, before seeing Rihanna performing "S&M" live on the concert. After the song, she performs "Skin"; during the performance, the singer takes two girls from the audience and performs lap dance as the set finishes with Nuno Bettencourt having a guitar solo. The scenes are intercut with Rihanna getting ready for the shoot of her We Found Love music video. Several scenes of Rihanna including getting off the plane, choosing clothes, getting ready for a shoot and greeting her fans are shown. The next parts of the video show her at the studio while recording her sixth studio album Talk That Talk (2011). Scenes are intercut with her doing the photo session for the album. Rihanna is shown at an Armani design meeting in London. She is talking about the commercial which they are preparing to shoot for the design company. Black-and-white scenes of Rihanna getting ready to go on stage again are shown before she starts performing "Raining Men". The performance of the song features her performing the song on top of a pink tank. Then, she gets off the tank and performs "Hard" and "Breakin' Dishes".

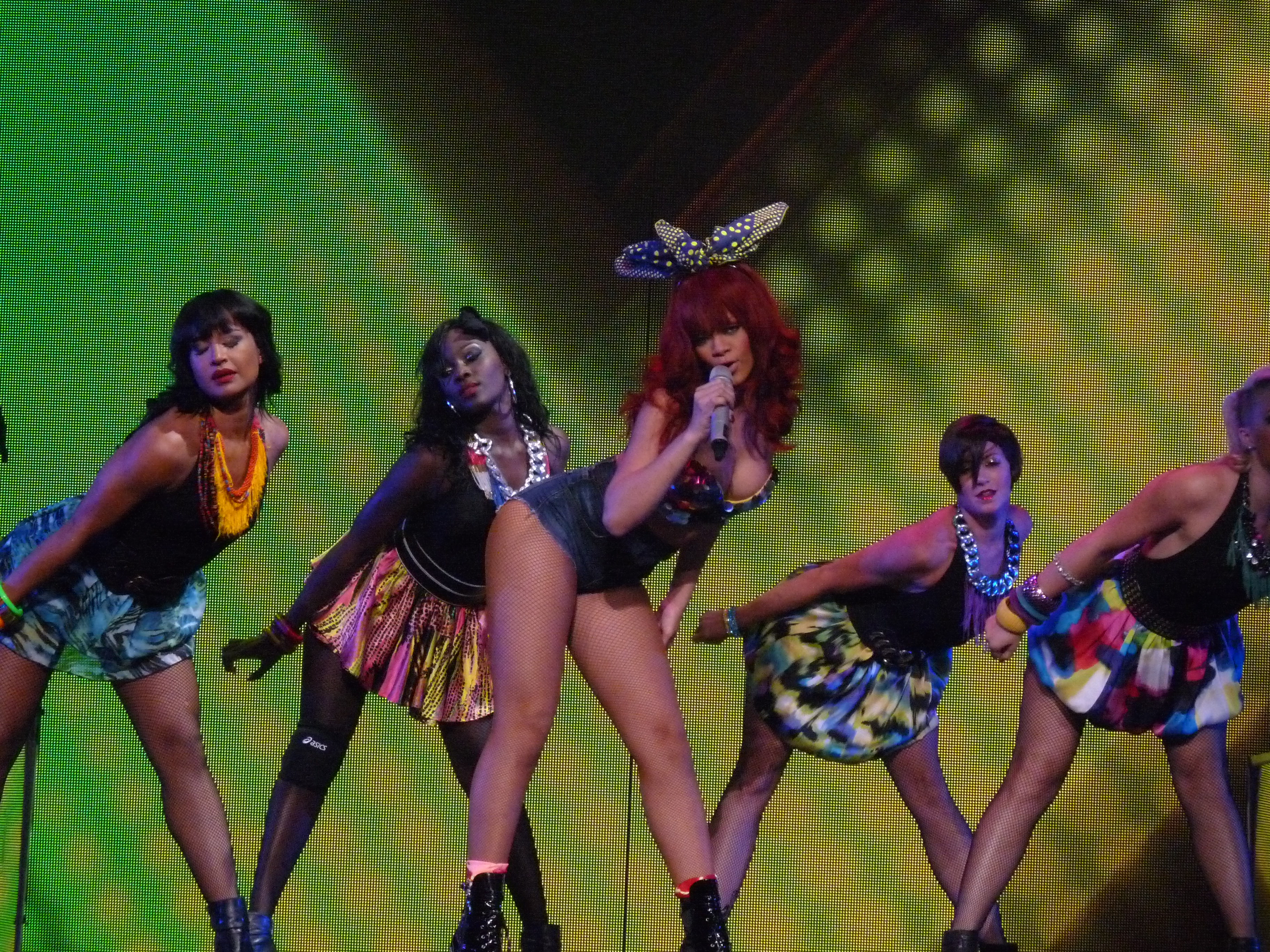
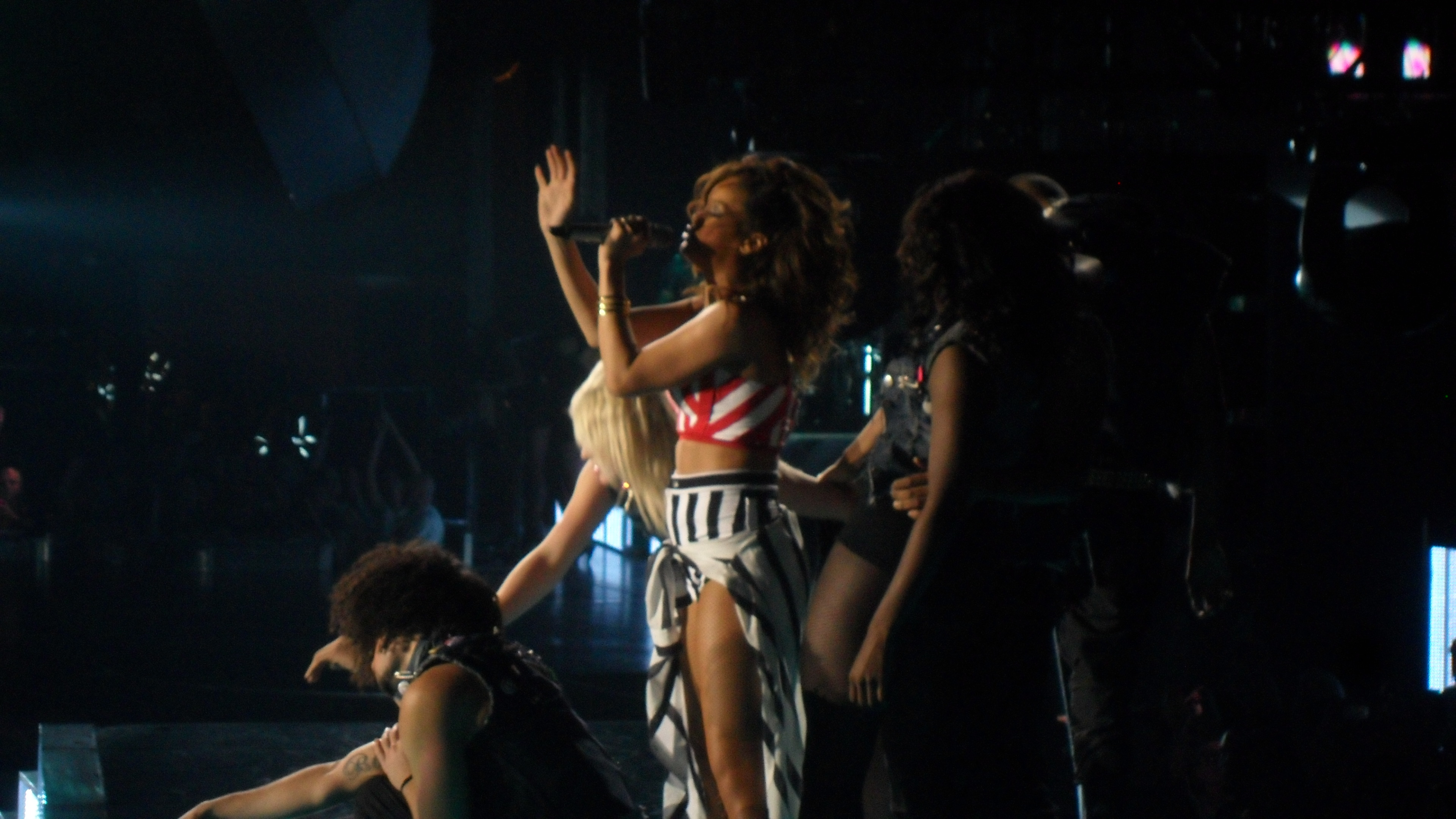
Rihanna performing "What's My Name?" (left) and "We Found Love" (right)— as of the last song of the concert.

After the performances, scenes of Rihanna and her team are shown choosing the artwork for Talk That Talk, as well as Rihanna preparing for her appearance on Ellen DeGeneres Show. She also discusses the breakdown she had during the tour. After the interlude, the singer is back on the stage wearing a yellow dress, performing "Unfaithful" on a platform. Then, she sings "Hate That I Love You" while sitting on a chair and then "California King Bed" as the last song from the set. Scenes of Rihanna having fun with her fans and making a birthday party for her manager Jay Brown is shown. Scenes of the singer in Madrid, one week before Christmas are shown; she takes a tour on the bus with which they are traveling around Europe. Rihanna is then shown getting ready for the show before starting to perform "What's My Name?" in daisy duke accompanied with four female dancers. She performs "Rude Boy" and is accompanied by male dancers wearing colorful outfits. Before performing "Cheers (Drink to That)" she takes a shot of a drink. The set is followed with "Don't Stop the Music" and finishes with Rihanna performing "Take a Bow" together with the audience. Before the encore starts, scenes of Rihanna preparing for the show are shown. She is arguing with the tour director how the set should arrange, because she wants to add "We Found Love" to it. She then rehearses for the choreography of the latter song alongside her dancers and explains how she learned the whole dance for 30 minutes. Her choreographer Tunisha praises and calls her "a dope". Then, the last set starts with a man who wears glasses performing on a piano. Rihanna then emerges and sits on the top of it. At one point in the performance, the piano started levitating and when the songs end the piano is again in the background. The music then transitions to "Umbrella"; the performance features golden drops on the LED screens. Loud Tour Live at the O2 finishes with Rihanna performing "We Found Love" as the final song; the end of the performance features red confetti flying around.

== Commercial performance ==
Loud Tour Live at the O2 debuted at number 12 on the Flemish Belgian Music DVD Chart for the week dated December 22, 2012. The next weak it climbed six places to number six. On January 19, 2013, the album reached its peak on the chart at number three. On the Wallonian Belgian Music DVD Chart, the album debuted at number three for the week dated December 29, 2012. After three weeks on the chart, it reached its peak of number two on January 19, 2013. The release also peaked at number three on the Swiss Music DVD Chart and number seven on the Dutch Music DVD Chart. For the last week of December 2012, Loud Tour Live at the O2 debuted at number 12 on the Czech Music DVD Chart. The following week it stayed on the same position, while in the second week of January 2013, it peaked at number six. In the last week of January it reached its peak of number five on the chart. The DVD debuted at peaked at number eighton the UK Music Video Chart and number nine on the Irish Music DVDs Chart. The album was more successful in France where debuted and peaked at number two on the French Music DVD Chart. Loud Tour Live at the O2 debuted at number 11 on the US Billboard Music Video Sales chart which was also its peak. Additionally, it peaked at number eight on the Australian Music DVD Chart.

== Track listing ==
No.	Title	Writer(s)	Length
1.	"Only Girl (In the World)"	Crystal Johnson; Mikkel S. Eriksen; Tor Erik Hermansen; Sandy Wilhelm	4:54
2.	"Disturbia"	Robert Allen; Andre Merritt; Chris Brown; Brian Kennedy	3:57
3.	"Shut Up and Drive"	Carl Sturken; Evan Rogers; Bernard Sumner; Peter Hook; Stephen Morris; Gillian Gilbert	4:21
4.	"Man Down"	Shama Joseph; Timothy Thomas; Theron Thomas; Shontelle Layne	4:19
5.	"S&M"	Hermansen; Eriksen; Wilhelm; Ester Dean	3:44
6.	"Skin"	Kenneth Coby; Ursula Yancy	6:14
7.	"Raining Men"	Melvin Hough II; Rivelino Wouter; Thomas; Thomas; Onika Maraj	2:57
8.	"Hard"	Terius Nash; Christopher Stewart; Robyn Fenty; Jay Jenkins	3:18
9.	"Breakin' Dishes"	Stewart; Nash	2:56
10.	"Unfaithful"	Smith; Eriksen; Hermansen	5:31
11.	"Hate That I Love You"	Smith; Eriksen; Hermansen	3:52
12.	"California King Bed"	Andrew Harr; Jermaine Jackson; Priscilla Renea; Alex Delicata	5:20
13.	"What's My Name?"	Eriksen; Hermansen; Dean; Traci Hale; Aubrey Graham	3:36
14.	"Rude Boy"	Eriksen; Hermansen; Dean; Riddick; Fenty; Rob Swire	3:51
15.	"Cheers (Drink to That)"	Harr; Jackson; Stacy Barthe; LP; Corey Gibson; Chris Ivery; Avril Lavigne; Lauren Christy; Scott Spock; Graham Edwards	4:40
16.	"Don't Stop the Music"	Eriksen; Hermansen; Tawanna Dabney; Michael Jackson	4:15
17.	"Take a Bow"	Smith; Eriksen; Hermansen	6:04
18.	"Love the Way You Lie"	Alexander Grant; Holly Hafermann; Marshall Mathers	5:17
19.	"Umbrella"	Stewart; Nash; Carter; Kuk Harrell	4:06
20.	"We Found Love"	Calvin Harris	3:54

== Credits and personnel ==
- Credits adapted from the ending notes of Loud Tour Live at the O2, Def Jam Recordings, SRP Records.

Band

- Rihanna (lead vocals)
- Chris Johnson (drummer) (drums)
- Charlie Wilson (musical director / keyboards / piano)
- Nicole Kehl (background singer)
- Nuno Bettencourt (guitars)
- Eric Smith (bass)
- Shayna Cook (background singer)
- Harvey "Lex" Marshall (musical director / keyboards / percussion)

Dancers

- Mikey Pesante
- Christina Chandler
- Christian Owens
- Khadija Nicholas
- Mikey Martinez
- Frankie Gordils
- Shauna Mitchell
- Michele Martinez

Photography

- Mellisa Forde for MTF Photography
- Djeneba Aduayom

Tour director

- Jamie King

Musical director

- Kevin Antunes

Vocal coach

- Robert Stevenson

Touring crew

- Joe Sanchez – Production manager
- Ramey Shippen – Production coordinator
- Roger Cabot – Stage manager
- Dominic Park – Backstage manager
- Ashley Hough – Backstage assistant
- Mark Wise – Venue security chief
- Larry Echols – Venue security
- Dan Roe – Backline crew chief
- Kenny Sharretts – Drum & percussion technician
- Steve Borisenko – Guitar technician
- Beth Schmitz – Wardrobe manager
- Lindsey Radzyminski – Wardrobe assistant
- Fritz Breitfelder – Head rigger
- Darrel Schlabach – Assistant rigger
- Juan Guerra – Automation crew chief
- Kyle Wolfson – Automation programmer
- Bruce Haynes – Head carpenter
- Jim Webb – Carpented & show caller
- Jesus "Chuy" Arroyo, Joe "Bobo" Bodner, Tyrone Bramwell, Tom Keane, FOH Audio, 8th Day, Sean "Sully" Sulivan – Carpenters
- Edward Ehrbar – Monitor Engineer
- Jim Corbin – Audio crew chief
- Jim Allen, Victor Arko, James La Marca – Audio technicians
- Bert Pare – Video director
- Mike Helton – Video crew chief
- Sean Binns – LED & projections technician
- Blake Hopkins, Graham Lambkin, Mike Muscato, Edward Prescott – Video technicians
- Background images – Video content
- Dominic Smith – Light director
- Carl Burnett – Lighting crew chief
- Philip de Boissiere, Matt Bright, William Coster, Dominic Fanelli, William Keating –
- Upstage – Lighting vendor
- Pyrotek FX, Kenn Macdonald – Pyrotechnics
- Eat Your Hearts Out – Cattering
- Amanda Kellar – Catering crew chief
- Paul Carrington, Graeme Lietch, Peter Mcgeechan, Antonia Stock – Chefs
- Renette Cronje, Gema Dally – FOH caterer
- Live Nation, Steve Homer – Local promoter
- Andrew Craig – Local promoter representative
- Steve Walker – Merchandising

Film crew

- Eugene O'Conor – Lighting Director
- Johnny McCullagh – Gaffer
- Brett Turnbull – Director of Photography
- Jamie Carrol, Dave Emery, Dogan Halil, Kelvin Richard, Harriet Sheard, Andy Watt, Alan Wells, Nick Wheeler, Shaun Willis – Camera operators
- Evan E. Rogers, James Tonkin – Documentary Camera Operators
- Nigel Bating – Documentary Sound Recordist
- Johnny Donne, Dave Mcnaulty, Alex Mott, Jem Morton, Alex Tate – Grips
- Nep Visions – Technical Facilities
- Brain Clark – Operations Manager
- Trevor Cooper – Unit Manager
- Marc Baker – Floor Manager
- Christine Henry – Script Supervisor
- Rod Warderl – Vision Mixer

== Charts ==
Chart (2012)	Peak position
Australian Music DVD Chart	8
Belgian Music DVD Chart (Flanders)	3
Belgian Music DVD Chart (Wallonia)	2
Czech Music DVD Chart	5
Dutch Music DVD Chart	7
French Music DVD Chart	2
Irish Music DVDs Chart	9
Italian Music DVD Chart	11
Spanish Music Video Chart	18
Swedish Music DVD Chart	9
Swiss Music DVD Chart	3
UK Music Video Chart	8
US Music Video Sales (Billboard)	11

== Certifications ==
Region	Certification	Certified units/sales
Brazil (Pro-Música Brasil)	Gold	30,000^{*}
^{*} Sales figures based on certification alone.

== Release history ==
Country	Date	Format	Label
The Netherlands	December 13, 2012	DVD	Universal Music
Australia	December 14, 2012	Blu-ray Disc, DVD	Universal Music
Germany	December 14, 2012	Blu-ray Disc, DVD	Universal Music
Norway	December 14, 2012	Blu-ray Disc, DVD	Universal Music
France	December 17, 2012	Blu-ray Disc, DVD	Universal Music
Portugal	December 17, 2012	Blu-ray Disc, DVD	Universal Music
Spain	December 17, 2012	Blu-ray Disc, DVD	Universal Music
Canada	December 18, 2012	Blu-ray Disc, DVD	Universal Music
Italy	December 18, 2012	Blu-ray Disc, DVD	Universal Music
United Kingdom	December 18, 2012	Blu-ray Disc, DVD	Universal Music
United States	December 18, 2012	Blu-ray Disc, DVD	Def Jam
