= Heat Wave (2009 American film) =

- Heat Wave
- Directed by: Rex Piano
- Written by: Jody Wheeler; Paolo Mazzucato
- Produced by: Charles Arthur Berg
- Starring: Jamie Luner; Greg Evigan; Ted Monte; Barbara Niven; Robert R. Shafer
- Cinematography: Mark Melville
- Edited by: John Blizek
- Music by: Eric Allaman
- Distributed by: Daro Film Distribution
- Release date: January 9, 2009
- Running time: 74 minutes
- Country: United States
- Language: English

Heat Wave is a 2009 action/adventure genre film directed by Rex Piano. It is about a heat wave that threatens to turn Los Angeles County into a parched, lifeless desert.

== Plot ==
There is an unexplained sudden rise in temperatures. A scientist has to put her theories into practice and come up with a solution to prevent what could be the inevitable. She is in a race against time to find the source of a heat wave. Otherwise, Los Angeles County could turn into lifeless desert. A greedy giant corporation that is also out to make millions of dollars is a feature in the film. The lead role of Dr. Kate Jansen is played by Jamie Luner. Other cast include Barbara Niven, Cole S McKay, David Storrs, Greg Evigan, Lynn Milano, Richard Tanner, Robert R. Shafer, Ted Monte and Tom Poster.

== Background ==
It was released on January 9, 2009. The story was written by Jody Wheeler and Paolo Mazzucato. It was directed by Rex Piano, who had also directed Blind Injustice in 2005. It was produced by Charles Arthur Berg and distributed by Regent Releasing /here! Films. It is also known as City on Fire.

== Cast ==
- Jamie Luner as Dr. Kate Jansen
- Greg Evigan as Ed Dobbs
- Ted Monte as Oliver Wilton
- Barbara Niven as Governor Carol Quinlan
- Robert R. Shafer as Roy Rogan
- Jake Thornton as Dr. Charles Covington
- Natalie Salins as Dana Wu
- Richard Tanner as Morty
- Lynn Milano as Ms. Grier
- David Storrs as Tony
- Tom Poster as Clive Williams
- Cole S. McKay as Brucker
