= Intellectual Property (film) =

- Directed by: Nicholas Peterson
- Written by: Nicholas Peterson; Hansen Smith
- Produced by: Nicholas Peterson; Martin Berneman
- Starring: Christopher Masterson; Lyndsy Fonseca
- Cinematography: Nic Sadler
- Edited by: Nicholas Peterson; Peter Devaney Flanagan
- Music by: Jasper Randall
- Release date: 2006
- Running time: 81 minutes
- Country: United States
- Language: English
- Budget: $500,000

Intellectual Property is a 2006 thriller and period piece starring Christopher Masterson and Lyndsy Fonseca. It was written, produced, and directed by Nicholas Peterson.

The main character, played by Christopher Masterson, is an inventor whose initial optimism has turned into cynicism as he struggles to protect his inventions from being lost in the Cold War.

== Cast ==
- Christopher Masterson as Paul
- Lyndsy Fonseca as Jenny
- Clayton Landey as Vladimir
- Bryan Lee Cranston as the radio host
- Tom Everett and Lorna Scott as Jenny’s parents

== Awards ==
The film won multiple awards:

- Best Actor, Christopher Masterson, Oxford International Film Festival
- Best Cinematography, Nic Sadler, 2006 Australian International Film Festival
- Best Director, Oxford International Film Festival
- Best Film, Oxford International Film Festival
- Grand Jury Prize, Best Film, DC Independent Film Festival
