= Dominique Vandenberg =

Belgian martial artist and stuntman

- Born: Dominique Horevoets; January 1 1969; Waasmont, Belgium
- Occupations: Actor, martial artist, stunt choreographer, stuntman, former foreign legionnaire

Dominique Vandenberg is a Belgian martial artist, actor and stunt performer.

Vandenberg lives in California, where he has appeared in movies such as Pit Fighter and Mortal Kombat.

== Background ==
Dominique Vandenberg was born Dominique Horevoets in Waasmont, Belgium. As a young adult, Vandenberg competed in numerous martial arts competitions, winning most of them, and left school at age sixteen to enroll in a Kunto training course in Okinawa, Japan. After graduating the course in a tie for first rank, Vandenberg returned to Belgium, where he was drafted into the military. Vandenberg volunteered for a post in Germany as it offered a shorter service of eight months (as opposed to a year). Immediately upon his release, Vandenberg began training for an invitational freestyle martial arts competition he had been invited to upon completion of the Kunto course. Vandenberg won the competition with only two months of training but was hit by a car and broke his leg.

Unable to fight in further events, Vandenberg left Belgium to join the French Foreign Legion. Graduating from basic training in the top five, he was allowed to pick his post. Vandenberg chose the elite paratrooper regiment, the 2REP, and, after more training, was sent to Africa. He spent five years in countries such as Chad, Nigeria, and the Central African Republic, fighting to control rebellions. During this time, he met his fiancée, Waruny, a freedom fighter. After their meeting, he returned to fulfill his last eight months of service to the Legion, but when he returned, she had been killed.

Vandenberg then left the Legion for good and traveled to Thailand to fight in their famed freestyle fighting rings, or "iron circles". After winning several bouts, he returned to Europe.

== Bibliography ==
- The Iron Circle: The True Life Story of Dominique Vandenberg, Dominique Vandenberg and Rick Rever, Volt Press, 2004.

== Filmography ==
- 1996 Barb Wire as Officer Frack
- 1998 Death Row the Tournament as Louis Gerard (Short)
- 1999 The Doorman as Andre Siegel
- 2002 The Honorable as Andre Siegel
- 2002 Gangs of New York as Dead Rabbit Gang Member
- 2004 Skeleton Man as Cottonmouth Joe
- 2005 Pit Fighter as Jack Severino
- 2006 Inland Empire as Trainyard Worker
- 2007 Alien Agent as Sartek
- 2009 Charlie Valentine as Dom
- 2009 Green Street Hooligans 2 as "Gonzo"
- 2009 The Perfect Sleep as Captain Keller
- 2009 The Butcher as 1970's IRA Member
- 2010 True Legend as Bald One-Eye
- 2011 Social Distortion: Machine Gun Blues as Special Agent Delvaux (Short)
- 2013 March with the Devil as himself
- 2019 Triple Threat as Dom
- 2019 The Mercenary as Maxx
- 2020 March with the Devil as himself
- 2021 Hell Hath No Fury

=== Stunts ===
- 1995 Mortal Kombat - Stunt Player
- 1999 The Doorman - Fight Coordinator
- 2002 Gangs of New York - Fight Coordinator
- 2003 Detonator - Stunts
- 2006 Inland Empire - Stunt Player
- 2007 Beowulf - Fight Coordinator

=== Producer ===
- 1999 The Doorman
- 2002 The Honorable
- 2019 Gray House
- 2019 The Mercenary

=== Writer ===
- 2013 March with the Devil
