= Elf Bowling =

1998 bowling video game

- A screencap of the game, with elf pins and a Christmas-themed frog hopping on the icy lane
- Developers: NStorm; Ignition Entertainment (Elf Bowling 1 & 2)
- Publishers: NStorm; Ignition Entertainment (Elf Bowling 1 & 2)
- Platforms: Microsoft Windows; Game Boy Advance (as Elf Bowling 1 & 2); Nintendo DS (as Elf Bowling 1 & 2)
- Release: Microsoft Windows; 1998; Game Boy Advance; November 28, 2005; Nintendo DS; December 1, 2005
- Genre: Sports
- Modes: Single-player, multiplayer

Elf Bowling is a 1998 sports video game for Microsoft Windows. It was originally created as promotional marketing content by Dan Ferguson and Mike Bielinski, co-founders of NVision Design, and became an Internet phenomenon in 1999 as the executable file circulated widely by email, amid rumours that it was a computer virus. It subsequently developed into a series of Windows games featuring Christmas-themed variations on sports and other games.

The first two games were later released together by Ignition Entertainment as Elf Bowling 1 & 2 for the Nintendo DS and Game Boy Advance. The compilation received generally negative reviews, with critics citing its graphics, audio, controls, and lack of additional content; the Nintendo DS version received scores of 1.4 out of 10 from GameSpot and 12 out of 100 from Metacritic. The series was also adapted into the computer-animated film Elf Bowling the Movie: The Great North Pole Elf Strike, released on DVD in 2007.

== History ==
The game was originally created as promotional marketing content by Dan Ferguson and Mike Bielinski, both co-founders of the game studio NVision Design. The game became an internet sensation in 1999 when people originally thought it was a computer virus. The game was an EXE file and was easily distributed as an attachment to emails. According to Media Metrix, among the 54 million people playing PC games in the month of December 2000, Elf Bowling was the game not bundled with Windows that hit the top 10, with 7.6 million players.

Vectrix Business Solutions acquired Nvision 1999 and subsequently filed for Chapter 11 bankruptcy. Elf Bowling and Frogapult were sold by Vectrix Business Solutions with the approval of the Bankruptcy Court on October 31, 2001, to Commotion Interactive, Inc. (Elf Bowling 3 was recently released by the Dallas firm NStorm, a subsidiary of Commotion Interactive). Matthew Lichtenwalter, CEO of NStorm and Commotion Interactive, has created the series since.

== Sequel ==
In the sequel to Elf Bowling, the elves return, as they attempt to go on an island vacation with old Kringle. Dingle Kringle (a failure as a used ice salesman) is Santa's elder brother, whom Mrs. Claus takes a shine to. The brothers make a double-or-nothing wager in a game of shuffleboard, of which on random occasions, a Moai can fall on an elf. The winner gets the title of "Father Christmas" while the loser loses his job. The elves are used as pucks.

=== Gameplay and scoring ===
The player grabs the thong bathing suit that the elf is wearing, then snaps it to propel the elf forward. There are 100-, 200-, and 300-point scoring zones, and a player can score 400 points if their elf slides all the way to the edge of the board without falling into the ocean; elves doing so get eaten by sharks or crushed by a falling Moai. There is also the possibility of an elf not advancing far enough to score, which happens if a player does not get enough power behind the snap. Only elves that are on the board after Santa and Dingle have taken their turns count towards the score, and it is possible for an elf to be knocked off the board by another elf, although it is also possible for the elves to be moved into higher scoring zones after contact. One elf per round is worth bonus points, indicated by a flashing bathing suit. In the first and second rounds, the bonus elf is worth double the throw, and in the third, he is worth triple the throw (meaning that the maximum number of points in these rounds that can be earned on one turn is 800 or 1200). The elf only appears once per round and appears randomly.

Bonus points can be gained by shooting the penguins and their balloons on an iceberg located to the right of the ship. The iceberg can also be shot, but doing so (in the right spot) will sink it and take it out of play.

== Other Elf Bowling games ==
To date, there have been eight editions of the game for Microsoft Windows.

- Elf Bowling 3 involved slinging elves in Mrs. Kringle's pink bra onto distant ice-bound targets.
- Super Elf Bowling (Elf Bowling 4) was a 3-dimensional upgrade of the original, with more complicated ball control and a wider variety of backgrounds, elf antics, and elf jokes. One could also play as a variety of characters, including Santa, Dingle, and Mrs. Kringle.
- Elf Bowling - Bocce Style (Elf Bowling 5) used the elves as bocce balls.
- Elf Bowling 6: Air Biscuits involved bowling the elf over a mound of snow, which sends the elf airborne. The elf could remain in the air by using "fart" power.
- Elf Bowling 7: The Last Insult returns the game to its original bowling but with new wrinkles. A story mode is added, and the Elves can and will do anything to stop Santa from rolling a strike. Santa, however, has power-ups that can foil them.
- Elf Bowling Hawaiian Vacation - Elf Bowling in exotic places.

Cancelled:

- Elf Bowling: Collector's Edition The game is a compilation of first five games Elf Bowling series. The title would've been developed and published by Detn8 Games and released on December 25, 2009, for the DS but was cancelled; believed due to Elf Bowling 1 & 2's poor performance.

== Elf Bowling 1 & 2 ==
The first two Elf Bowling games were released by Ignition Entertainment under the title Elf Bowling 1 & 2 for the Nintendo DS and Game Boy Advance. The pack received generally negative reviews from critics, citing poor graphics, crude audio and controls, and no extras beyond the original freeware version. It ranks as one of the lowest scoring games at both GameSpot and Metacritic, receiving only 1.4 out of 10 at GameSpot and 12 out of 100 at Metacritic.

== Film adaptation ==
Elf Bowling the Movie: The Great North Pole Elf Strike
- UK DVD cover
- Directed by: Dave Kim; Rex Piano
- Written by: Martin Olson
- Based on: Elf Bowling
- Produced by: Dave Kim; Rex Piano
- Starring: Tom Kenny; Joe Alaskey; Rex Piano; Jill Talley
- Edited by: Dave Kim
- Music by: Chris Anderson
- Production companies: Film Brokers International; Great Highway Company
- Distributed by: Screen Media Ventures; Film Brokers International
- Release dates: December 4, 2006 (screening): October 2, 2007; (DVD)
- Running time: 82 minutes
- Countries: United States; Fiji; South Korea (outsourced)
- Language: English
- Budget: $6,500,000

A computer-animated film based on the games was released on October 2, 2007, and was entitled Elf Bowling the Movie: The Great North Pole Elf Strike. It features the voices of Rex Piano, Jill Talley, Tom Kenny, and the late Joe Alaskey. The movie was animated between 2005 and 2006.

The film was a United States–Fiji–South Korea co-production directed by Dave Kim, with Rex Piano as co-director. The musical score for the film was composed by Chris Anderson. Simi Valley, California resident David Kim was asked to direct the film while studying editing at the Academy of Art University; Kim took the offer as a way to break into the film industry, previously working as a production assistant on music videos. After finishing Elf Bowling, he got work as a production coordinator on The Simpsons Movie (2007) and The Golden Compass (2007). Produced by Filmbrokers International, Elf Bowling the Movie began production in Fiji and South Korea before moving into a Simi Valley house owned by Kim's mother, where the film's story reel was edited. Dance movements for the musical sequences were animated with motion capture, Kim himself wearing one of the Mo-cap suits. Screen Media Films, a company of Universal Studios Home Entertainment, distributed Elf Bowling the Movie.

The film was released on DVD on October 2, 2007 before being released on Amazon Prime on January 1, 2008, and Blu-ray on May 18, 2016.

Due to receiving negative reviews from critics for its writing, animation, directing, humor, plot, musical numbers, voice acting, characterizations, and for having little or nothing to do with the premise of the game, plans for a sequel titled Elf Bowling 2: The Great Halloween Pumpkin-Heist were immediately cancelled. The film received a parody stage adaptation in 2021 by Chapman University's sketch comedy group The Player's Society, adapted by Sasha Espinosa and directed by Delaney Tobin.
