= Australian International Film Festival =

The Australian International, or AI, was a Melbourne festival held in 2006.

An earlier festival with this name was renamed to Canberra International.

== Awards ==
- Golden Spotlight Award, the Best Feature Film and Best Short Film
- Silver Spotlight Award, winner in other core categories

== October 2006 ==
In 2006 it was held at Hoyts Melbourne Central on 21–30 October under the direction of Tim. K. Ali and Cameron R. Male.

- Best Feature Film: Self-Medicated (US), directed by Monty Lapica
- Best Australian Film: Puppy (Australia) Kieran Galvin
- Best International Film: Beautiful Dreamer (US), directed by Terri Farley-Teruel
- Best Debut Feature: Johnny Montana (US), directed by John Gavin
- Best Director: Jaume Balagueró for Fragile (Spain)
- Best Actor: Paddy Considine for Stoned (UK), directed by Stephen Woolley
- Best Actress: Diane Venora for Self-Medicated (US) directed by Monty Lapica
- Best Cinematography: Nic Sadler for Intellectual Property (US), directed by Nicholas Peterson
- Best Editing: Rick Ray for 10 Questions for the Dalai Lama (US), directed by Rick Ray
- Best Short Film: Le génie de la boîte de raviolis / The Genie of the Ravioli Box (Switzerland), directed by Claude Barras
