= Patient Seven =

American horror anthology film

- Directed by: Danny Draven
- Starring: Michael Ironside; Jack Plotnick; Drew Fonteiro; Rane Jameson
- Music by: Jojo Draven
- Production company: Terror Films
- Release date: October 11, 2016
- Running time: 116 minutes
- Country: United States
- Language: English

Patient Seven is a 2016 American horror anthology film with segments directed by Danny Draven, Paul Davis, Ómar Örn Hauksson, Dean Hewison, Joel Morgan and Johannes Persson. The film is inspired by 1972 British Amicus Productions anthology film Asylum and primarily stars Michael Ironside, featuring Jack Plotnick, Drew Fonteiro, and Rane Jameson in the frame story, with individual anthology entries featuring their own casts. Patient Seven is composed of seven segments, each of which relates to some psychological psychosis, ranging from amnesia to hallucinations to schizophrenia, or horror movie trope, particularly zombies, vampires, and ghosts.

== Plot ==
The anthology's framing device features Michael Ironside as the sadistic Dr. Daniel Marcus who has chosen to interview a series of patients whose psychosis he believes is caused by previous trauma. Dr. Paul Victor (Jack Plotnick) permits him to interview six patients who all match his requirements, leaving the orderlies Shane (Drew Fonteiro) and Kyle (Rane Jameson) to follow his orders.

Marcus then proceeds to trigger each patient's fears through some element of their past, causing them to panic and relate their story through the flashbacks, each of which is related through one of the segments. He dismisses each patient with sharp, cruel rebukes of what he claims are their 'fake' psychoses.

After summoning all six patients, Marcus steps into the hallway to discover Shane and Kyle dead. He is hit over the head by one of the patients he tormented and wakes up in a straitjacket, surrounded by the patients who he has been tormenting. Just as he's killed, he suddenly jerks awake, revealing that Marcus is the titular seventh patient, with Dr. Victor revealed to be his doctor. After relating a story of his own, Marcus is mocked by Victor the same way he mocked the 'patients' in his hallucination, but when Victor turns his back, Marcus attacks and breaks his neck. Picking up Victor's glasses, he says that it's "Time to make his rounds" before proceeding to go on a killing spree through the institution.

== Segments ==
Segment	Director(s)	Writers	Producers	Summary
The Visitant	Nicholas Peterson	Nicholas Peterson	Nickolas Peterson, Jon Heder, Jason Speer	A hallucinating mother believes she sees a demon.
The Body	Paul Davis	Paul Davis and Paul Fischer	Paul Fischer	On Halloween, a killer uses the opportunity to dispose of a corpse in plain sight.
Undying Love	Ómar Örn Hauksson	Ómar Örn Hauksson	Kristen Andrea Johannesson	A woman blames the death of her cheating lover and his partner on a zombie attack.
The Sleeping Plot	Dean Hewison	Dean Hewison, Sam Dickson, Richard Falkner, Aidee Walker	Ruth Korver	A woman accused of murdering her best friend claims she committed suicide.
Banishing	Erlingur Thoroddsen	Jacey Heldrich and Brian McAuley	Jacey Heldrich	A girl's sister is haunted by a strange, terrifying woman.
Death Scenes	Joel Morgan	Joel Morgan	Ben Franklin and Anthony Melton	A man relates the story of his friend, a would-be vampire killer.
Evaded	Johannes Persson and Rasmus Wassberg	Johannes Persson and Rasmus Wassberg	Johannes Persson and Rasmus Wassberg	A trip to a distant destination comes with some unfortunate consequences for a mother and son.

== Cast ==
- Michael Ironside as Dr. Daniel Marcus
- Jack Plotnick as Dr. Paul Victor
- Drew Fonteiro as Shane
- Rane Jameson as Kyle
- Anna Rose Moore as Jill / Patient One
- Amy Smart as Jill’s Mother
- Daniel Lench as John Doe / Patient Two
- Alfie Allen as The Man
- Sirry Jons as Gabrielle / Patient Three
- Amanda Graeff as Sarah / Patient Four
- Grace Van Dien as Jessa / Patient Five
- William Mark McCullough as Damon / Patient Six
