= Charles Arthur Berg =

American film producer

- Born: October 11, 1970 (age 55); San Francisco, California, U.S.
- Occupation(s): Producer, actor, director
- Years active: 1997–present

Charles Arthur Berg is a film producer and actor who has been in the film industry since the mid to late 1990s. His work as a producer includes Chupacabra: Dark Seas, Skeleton Man and The Butcher. Work as a line producer includes Ring of Darkness, The Sisterhood and Witches of the Caribbean. As an actor, he has had roles in The Butcher, Polanski Unauthorized and Blind Injustice.

== Background ==
Berg is from Los Angeles, California. He is connected with the KL Samurai project which is Malaysia based multi-national movie project set up to target a global audience. He has a production company One Cut Above Productions.

== Film work ==
=== Producer ===
As a producer he executive produced the Rob Reiner directed film, "Being Charlie." The film was accepted into the 2015 Toronto Film Festival. Charles also executive produced, "Green Street Hooligans 11." (2009). He line produced 2005 Sundance entry "Wristcutters" as well as genre action films such as "Code of Honor," with Steven Seagal (2015) and "Swelter" (2014) with Jean-Claude Van Damme. The Calling, produced by Charles a Damian Chapa directed film about evangelist Leroy Jenkins. This was released in 2000. He produced Murder.com that was released in 2008. Before the end of the decade he was the producer of the Rex Piano directed film Heat Wave. This was an action film about a scientist in a race against time to find the source of a heat wave that threatens to turn Los Angeles County into a parched, lifeless desert. Berg has produced many films, "Minkow" (2015), "Brazen Bull" (2010), "Wake" (2009) Starring Ian Somerhalder, Bijou Phillips, Jane Seymour and Danny Masterson. In all Charles has produced or line produced over 50 feature films. He is currently a in house line producer for Red Bull Media House managing several TV series.

=== Co-producer ===
In 2004 he was one of the producers in the Johnny Martin movie Skeleton Man, a film about a military team hunting down a homicidal maniac. Michael Rooker and Casper Van Dien starred in the film. In the same year, he was co-producer and production manager of How to Lose Your Lover.

=== Line producer ===
In 2009, he was line producer for the Ellie Kanner directed film Wake.

=== Acting ===
In 2007, he starred in Fuego as Malik with Damian Chapa playing the title role and David Carradine playing Lobo. In 2009, he played the part of Bryan Hobbs, a detective in Polanski Unauthorized which was a film about Roman Polanski, directed by Damian Chapa. Around 2012, he played the part of Victor in Captured, an independent horror / thriller film that stars Brittany Curran.

== Links ==
- Charles Arthur Berg at IMDb
