= Pit Fighter (film) =

2005 film by Jesse V. Johnson

- Directed by: Jesse V. Johnson
- Written by: Jesse V. Johnson
- Produced by: James Henney; Ari Palitz; Gareth West
- Starring: Dominique Vandenberg; Steven Bauer; Stephen Graham
- Cinematography: Robert Hayes
- Edited by: Cari Coughlin
- Music by: Marcello De Francisci
- Release date: 2005
- Country: United States
- Language: English

Pit Fighter is a 2005 action film directed by Jesse V. Johnson and starring Dominique Vandenberg, Steven Bauer and Stephen Graham and Scott Adkins.

== Plot ==
Jack Severino (Dominique Vandenberg) is a quiet yet intense man who has no recollection of his past. He spends his time in violent Vale Tudo fights in a small South American village. The only friend he has is his manager Manolo (Steven Bauer), an Indian trying to escape poverty. Jack's violent past catches up with him when he sees a woman (Stana Katic) he has not seen in years bring back his memories.

== Cast ==
- Dominique Vandenberg as Jack Severino
- Steven Bauer as Manolo
- Fernando Carrillo as Veneno
- Stephen Graham as Harry
- Stana Katic as Marianne
- Scott Adkins as Nathan
- Timothy V. Murphy as Father Michael
- Ric Sarabia as Dr. Vincent
- Carlos Buti as Carlos
- Catherine Munden as Virgin Mary
- Fivel Stewart as Lucinda
- Eddie Morales as Don Rafael
- Erich A. Muller as Julio Zambista
- Andre McCoy as Brazilian Fighter
- Marco Khan as Russian Fighter
- Gary Gray as Supremacist Fighter
- Edwin Villa as Capoeira Fighter
- Ciona Johnson as Female Fighter
- Kim Collea as Female Fighter
- Maurice Negro as Wrestler
- Paul Cullen as "Scarface"
- Alice Amter as Palm Reader
- Celina Zambon as Dancer
- Aspen Stevens as Dancer
- Fernanda Romero as Conchita (uncredited)
- Al Burke as Mob Boss (uncredited)
- Booboo Stewart as Vendor (uncredited)
- Maegan Stewart as Vendor (uncredited)

== Reception ==
The film was not well received by critics and has a 0% fresh rating (from 3 reviews) on Rotten Tomatoes and David Nusair of Reel Film said "There've been a lot of bad straight-to-video action flicks over the years, but this is surely the worst". DVD Talk reviewer Scott Weinberg said in his review, "Just because something's (very) cheaply made, amazingly generic, and more than a little stupid -- that doesn't mean it's boring. And if you're the sort of movie fan who'd grab a DVD called Pit Fighter from the shelf and flip it over to read the plot synopsis -- then Pit Fighter is probably something you'd enjoy."
