= Assassination Games =

- Theatrical release poster
- Directed by: Ernie Barbarash
- Written by: Aaron Rahsaan Thomas
- Produced by: Justin Bursch; Brad Krevoy; Patrick Newall
- Starring: Jean-Claude Van Damme; Scott Adkins
- Cinematography: Phil Parmet
- Edited by: Peter Devaney Flanagan
- Music by: Neal Acree
- Production companies: MediaPro Studios; Rodin Entertainment
- Distributed by: Samuel Goldwyn Films; Sony Pictures Home Entertainment
- Release date: July 29, 2011
- Running time: 101 minutes
- Country: United States
- Language: English

Assassination Games is a 2011 American action thriller film directed by Ernie Barbarash and starring Jean-Claude Van Damme and Scott Adkins with Ivan Kaye as their main antagonist. The film was released in the United States on July 29, 2011.

== Premise ==
In France, Vincent Brazil (Jean-Claude Van Damme) is a contract killer, willing to take any job if the price is right. Roland Flint (Scott Adkins) retired from being a contract killer after an attack by drug kingpin Polo Yakur (Ivan Kaye) left Roland's wife Anna (Bianca Van Varenberg) in a coma that she still hasn't emerged from.

When a contract is put out on Yakur, both Vincent and Roland want to take the contract—Vincent is in it for the money, and Roland is in it to make Yakur pay for putting Anna in a coma.

With crooked Interpol agents and vicious members of the criminal underworld hot on their trail, Vincent and Roland reluctantly join forces to mow down their enemies so they can find and kill Yakur.

== Cast ==
- Jean-Claude Van Damme as Vincent Brazil
- Scott Adkins as Roland Flint
- Ivan Kaye as Polo Yakur
- Valentin Teodosiu as Blanchard
- Alin Panc as Kovacs
- Kevin Chapman as Culley
- Serban Celea as Wilson Herrod
- Michael Higgs as Godfrey
- Kris van Varenberg as Schell
- Marija Karan as October
- Bianca van Varenberg as Anna Flint
- Andrew French as Nalbandian

== Production ==
Assassination Games began development under the working title The Weapon with Russel Mulcahy attached to direct. Initially Steven Seagal had signed on to star alongside Van Damme. After Seagal dropped out of the role, Vinnie Jones was considered to replace Steven Seagal, though the role eventually went to Scott Adkins. Shooting took place in Bucharest, Romania, and New Orleans, Louisiana.

== Release ==
The film had a limited release on July 29, 2011. Sony Pictures Home Entertainment released the DVD in the United States on September 6, 2011, and in the United Kingdom on October 10, 2011.

== Reception ==
IGN gave the film a 6 out of 10 stars and wrote, "If you need a quick dose of action, Assassination Games should do the trick. Don't expect a masterpiece and you should walk away moderately pleased with the experience". Rohit Rao of DVD Talk rated it 2 out of 5 stars and wrote, "Van Damme and Adkins show up to the party, game for anything, but director Ernie Barbarash insists on weighing them down with a convoluted script that mistakes meanness for grit." Gabe Toro of Indiewire rated it C and wrote, "The fight choreography doesn’t lift this effort above Van Damme’s usual direct-to-DVD offerings, but it does prove that there are still filmmakers who understand how to shoot action." Ike Oden of DVD Verdict described it as "a cheesy, pretentious, and poorly paced action film with a jet black nihilistic streak".
