= Charlie Valentine =

- Directed by: Jesse V. Johnson
- Written by: Jesse V. Johnson
- Produced by: Ray Calaveri; Ted Warren; Bill Gottlieb
- Starring: Raymond J. Barry; Michael Weatherly; Keith David; Steven Bauer; James Russo; Tom Berenger
- Cinematography: Jonathan Hall
- Edited by: Carrie Caughlin; Julia Sandberg Hansson
- Music by: Marcello De Francisci; Wagner Fulco
- Production companies: America Media Group; Gorilla
- Distributed by: Lions Gate Home Entertainment
- Release date: March 1, 2009
- Running time: 96 minutes
- Country: United States
- Language: English
- Budget: $6 million

Charlie Valentine, also released as The Hitmen Diaries: Charlie Valentine, is a 2009 crime drama starring Raymond J. Barry in the title role. The film co-stars Michael Weatherly, James Russo, and Tom Berenger, and was shot in Las Vegas, Nevada, and Los Angeles, California. The film was directed by Jesse V. Johnson.

== Plot ==
Aging small-time gangster Charlie Valentine (Barry) tries to pull one over on his boss Rocco (Russo) for some retirement cash. He assembles his old group, and despite Sal's (David) misgivings, they go through with it. The con goes wrong and only Charlie escapes with his life, leaving Rocco furious and demanding revenge. Charlie reconciles with his estranged son Danny (Weatherly) for a place to stay. Danny is curious about his father's lifestyle, though he is apprehensive after serving time in prison. Regardless the two men rob Danny's boss Ferucci (Bauer), who catches on and later finds out about Charlie's hitman life. Ferucci informs Rocco of the Valentines, pinning the two men in a death match in Ferucci's club that leaves only Danny still alive.

== Cast ==
- Raymond J. Barry as Charlie Valentine
- Michael Weatherly as Danny Valentine
- James Russo as Rocco
- Tom Berenger as Becker
- Steven Bauer as Ferucci
- Maxine Bahns as Jenny
- Keith David as Sal
- Glenn Taranto as Mob Collector
- Dominique Vandenberg as Dom
- Kevin Scott Allen as Marko

== Accolades ==
Director Jesse Johnson won the Best Picture award Action On Film International Film Festival. The film also won for Best Action Film, Best Cinematography, and Best Score.
