= The Butcher (2009 film) =

- Directed by: Jesse V. Johnson
- Written by: Jesse V. Johnson
- Produced by: Ted J. Pryor; Charles Arthur Berg
- Starring: Eric Roberts; Keith David
- Cinematography: Robert Hayes
- Edited by: Ken Blackwell
- Music by: Marcello De Francisci
- Distributed by: 20th Century Fox Home Entertainment
- Release date: July 14, 2009
- Country: United States
- Language: English

The Butcher is a 2009 action film directed by Jesse V. Johnson and starring Eric Roberts.

== Plot ==
Merle Hench (Eric Roberts), nicknamed "The Butcher", is a henchman for gangster Murdoch (Robert Davi) until Hench takes the fall for his boss. Having survived, Hench will earn his nickname on a mission for revenge. Merle dies after killing Murdoch's gang The Vegas mobsters show up and take their money back, but Janie gets the winnings from Merles last bet, buys the diner and names it after Merle

== Cast ==
- Eric Roberts as Merle "The Butcher" Hench
- Robert Davi as Murdoch
- Keith David as Larry Cobb
- Geoffrey Lewis as Naylor
- Irina Björklund as Jackie
- Michael Ironside as Teddy Carmichael
- Bokeem Woodbine as Pete "Chinatown Pete"
- Guillermo Díaz as Owen Geiger
- Paul Dillon as Doyle
- Jerry Trimble as Eddie Hellstrom
- Charles Arthur Berg as Charlie "Loco Charlie"
- Julie Carmen as Rose
- Vernon Wells as 1970's IRA Commander
- Dominique Vandenberg as 1970's IRA Member

== Production ==
Filming of The Butcher took place in California, particularly Los Angeles and Rosemead in September 2007. 20th Century Fox Home Entertainment released the film straight to DVD in July 2009.
