= Jesse V. Johnson =

British film director, screenwriter and stunt coordinator

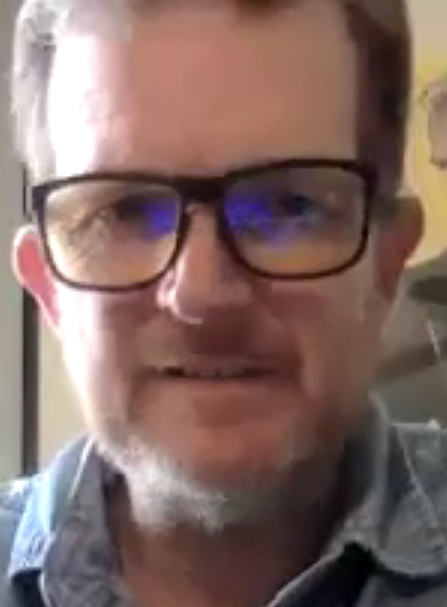
- Johnson in 2023
- Born: 29 November 1971 (age 54); Winchester, England
- Occupations: Film director, screenwriter، Stuntman

Jesse V. Johnson (born on 29 November 1971) is a British film director, screenwriter and stunt coordinator.

Johnson has made primarily action films. These include the 2009 revenge thriller The Butcher and the crime drama Charlie Valentine. He is also known for his collaboration with actor and martial artist Scott Adkins.

Prior to becoming a filmmaker, he worked as a stuntman and later a stunt coordinator. His stunt performing credits include: M:i:III, Charlie's Angels, Mars Attacks!, Planet of the Apes, Starship Troopers, War of the Worlds, Total Recall, The Thin Red Line, Terminator 3: Rise of the Machines and Paranormal Activity: The Ghost Dimension. He worked as a stunt coordinator on Beowulf.

== Filmography ==
Feature films

Year	Title	Director	Writer
1998	Death Row the Tournament	Yes	Yes
1999	The Doorman	Yes	Yes
2002	The Honorable	Yes	Yes
2005	Pit Fighter	Yes	Yes
2007	The Last Sentinel	Yes	Yes
2007	Alien Agent	Yes	No
2008	The Fifth Commandment	Yes	No
2009	Charlie Valentine	Yes	Yes
2009	Green Street Hooligans 2	Yes	No
2009	The Butcher	Yes	Yes
2013	The Package	Yes	No
2017	Savage Dog	Yes	Yes
2017	The Beautiful Ones	Yes	Yes
2018	Accident Man	Yes	No
2018	The Debt Collector	Yes	Yes
2019	Triple Threat	Yes	No
2019	Avengement	Yes	Yes
2019	The Mercenary	Yes	No
2020	Debt Collectors	Yes	Yes
2021	Hell Hath No Fury	Yes	No
2022	White Elephant	Yes	Yes
2023	One Ranger	Yes	Yes
2023	Boudica: The Queen of War	Yes	Yes
2024	Chief of Station	Yes	No
2025	Thieves Highway	Yes	No
2026	Above and Below	Yes	No
2026	Mexicali	No	Yes

Television

Year	Title	Notes
2026	The Pendragon Cycle: Rise of the Merlin	Director
