= Rex Piano =

American film director

- Born: September 1, 1955 (age 71); New York
- Occupations: film director, screenwriter, TV actor, and producer
- Years active: 1979–present
- Family: Henry Piano (father, born 1904), Joan Piano (mother, born 1912), Jimmy Piano (older brother, born 1953)

Rex Piano is an American film director, screenwriter, TV actor and producer. Piano's works include Cave in (2003), Faultline (2004), Hope Ranch (2002/2004), Snowman's Pass (2004), Blind Injustice (2005), Found (2005), Captive Hearts (2005), Trapped! (2006), Elf Bowling the Movie: The Great North Pole Elf Strike (2007), and Heat Wave (2009).

== Background ==
Piano has directed both television series and film features. His work on The Month of August resulted in the feature picking up two awards for Best Feature and Best Comedy Feature. He has worked with actress Sazzy Lee Varga.

Working in television, Piano has directed episodes of Mike Hammer, Private Eye which stars Stacy Keach.

== Career ==
He directed the 2004 film What Lies Above which starred Nicole Eggert, Marc Singer, George Stults and Mike Dopud. In the film a woman and companion go on an expedition to locate the body of her former fiancé. The real reason wasn't to do with the fiancé. It was to find a fallen spy satellite. Her life is then in danger.

Piano directed the 2006 film Trapped which was written by Peter Sullivan and Jason Preston. It was about some kidnappers to take control of an abandoned hotel. They coerce a woman to access government data. It starred Alexandra Paul, Nicholas Turturro, Dennis Christopher, Mike Dopud, Tatiana Maslany, Mark Gibbon, Jeff Rector, Barbara Bain, Clint Jung, and Maggie Wagner.

== Bibliography ==
- Roberts, Jerry (2009). "Rex Piano". In Scarecrow Press (ed.). Encyclopedia of Television Film Directors. Scarecrow Press. p. 451. ISBN 9780810863781.
