= Anna Butkevich =

Ukrainian TV presenter and actress

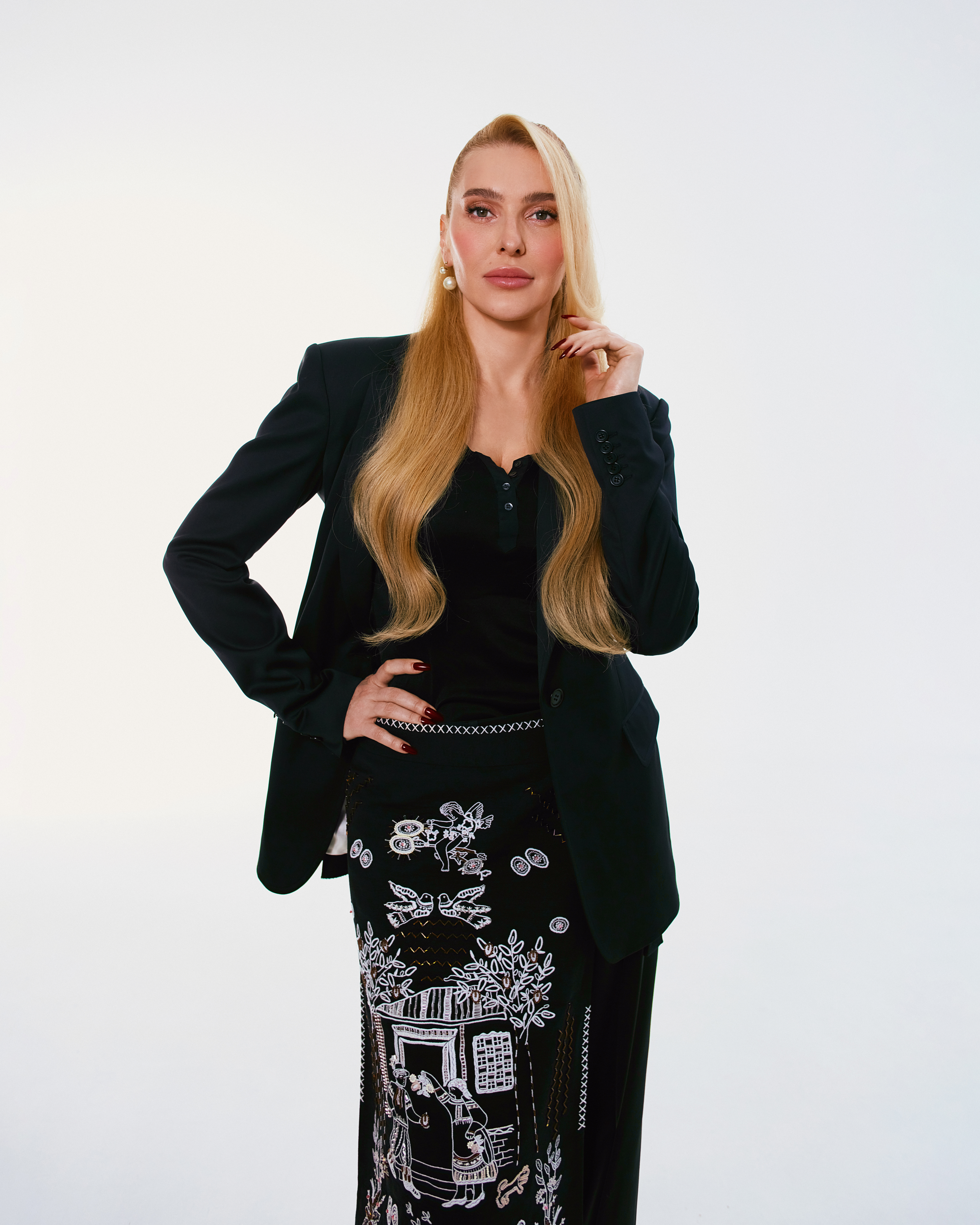
- Butkevich in 2024
- Born: 27 February 1985 (age 40); Dnipropetrovsk Ukrainian SSR, Soviet Union
- Occupation(s): TV and radio presenter, model, actress

Anna Butkevich (Ukrainian: Анна Геннадіївна Буткевич; born 27 February 1985 in Dnipropetrovsk, Soviet Union) is a Ukrainian TV and radio presenter, model, and actress.

== Biography ==
Anna Butkevich was born on 27 February 1985 in Dnipropetrovsk, Ukraine. She graduated from the Faculty of Law of Oles Honchar Dnipro National University named after Oles Honchar.

In 2015, she debuted in show business, took part in the clips "Это всё она" by a Russian singer Sergey Lazarev (Russian: Сергей Лазарев) and "Your style" by the group "Kazaky". In the same year she became the face of the brand Andre Tan. In 2016, she became the face of the jewelry house "The House of Moussaieff".

Since 2016, she is the author and presenter of the popular radio show "Without makeup" (Ukrainian: «Без гриму»). Her guests were such Ukrainian celebrities as Andriy Shevchenko and Wladimir Klitschko, Iryna Bilyk and Ivan Dorn, Monatik and Nastya Kamensky, Masha Efrosinina and many others.

In 2016, she debuted in the cinema as an actress, having starred in the ironic comedy "Future in the past" directed by Alexander Shapiro. The premiere of the film took place at the Kyiv International Film Festival "Molodist" in October of the same year.

In 2017 she was a presenter on the red carpet of the Eurovision Song Contest 2017, starred in the main role in the short feature film "Talk to me" (Ukrainian: «Говори зі мною») directed by Kateryna Lesyk, took part in the shooting of the popular TV series "Female Doctor" (Ukrainian: «Жіночий лікар»).

In 2018, she took part in the popular TV show "Give me back the beauty" (Ukrainian: «Поверніть мені красу») as an expert, and also starred in a new feature film with the working title "Present continuous" directed by Alexander Shapiro.

She is divorced and is raising her daughter.
