= Nicholas Peterson =

American animator (born 1977)

- Born: October 3, 1977 (age 48); United States
- Occupation: Film director
- Website: http://npfilm.com

Nicholas Peterson is a graduate of the California Institute of the Arts (CalArts) where he developed skills in stop-motion animation. In 1998 Peterson crewed on the first ever stop-motion IMAX film More, later nominated for an Academy Award for Best Animated Short Film. Soon after, he made his own stop-motion short film MuM receiving critical acclaim at the 2000 Sundance Film Festival and winning a College Emmy Award.

In 2001 Peterson made the live action short film Cookies for Harry, before setting sights on directing a low budget feature film. In spring 2006 Peterson completed his first independent feature film Intellectual Property starring Christopher Masterson of Malcolm in the Middle.

Peterson continues to live and work in Los Angeles.

== Filmography ==
- Patient Seven (2016), segment The Visitant
- Intellectual Property (2006)
- Cookies for Harry (2001)
- MuM (1999)

== Awards ==
- Australian International Film Festival Silver Spotlight Award - Intellectual Property (2006)
- ATAS Foundation College Television Awards 1999 (nominated) Traditional Animation - MuM (1999)
- Hamptons International Film Festival 1999 Undergraduate Student Film Award - MuM (1999)
- Matita Animation Film Festival 1999 Matita Grand Prix for Professionals - MuM (1999)
- BEST CINEMATOGRAPHY Australian International Film Festival-Intellectual Property (2007)
- BEST FILM Oxford International Film Festival - Intellectual Property (2007)
- BEST DIRECTOR Oxford International Film Festival - Intellectual Property (2007)
- BEST ACTOR CHRISTOPHER MASTERSON Oxford International Film Festival - Intellectual Property (2007)
- GRAND JURY PRIZE - BEST FILM DC Independent Film Festival - Intellectual Property (2007)
