= Scott Adkins =

English actor and martial artist (born 1976)

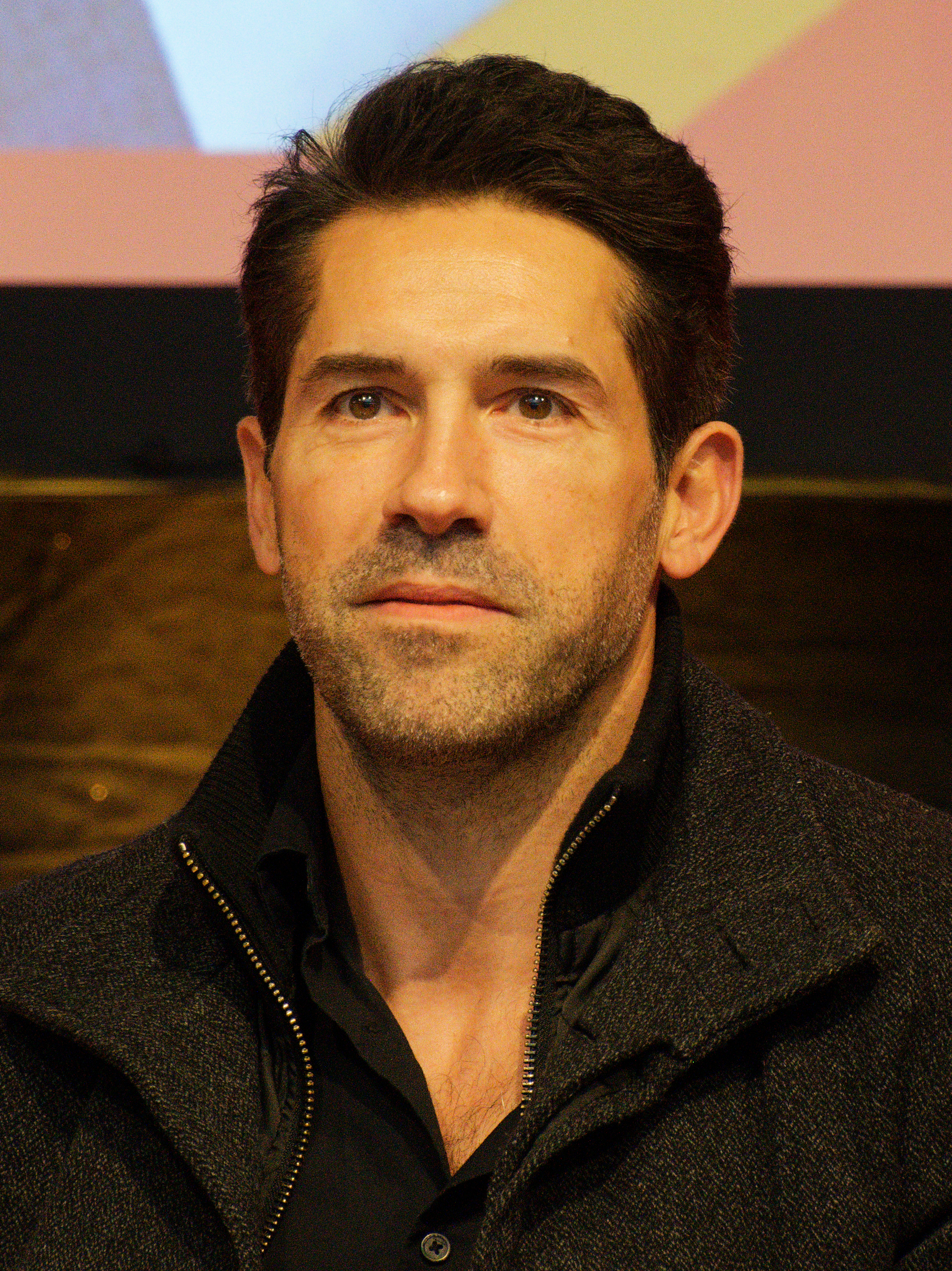
- Adkins in December 2023
- Born: Scott Edward Adkins; 17 June 1976 (age 50); Sutton Coldfield, England
- Occupations: Actor; screenwriter; producer; martial artist
- Years active: 1998–present
- Height: 5 ft 11 in (180 cm)
- Spouse: Lisa Adkins
- Children: 2
- Website: scottadkins.com

Scott Edward Adkins (born 17 June 1976) is an English actor and martial artist. He gained prominence with his portrayal of the Russian prison fighter Yuri Boyka in the American film Undisputed II: Last Man Standing (2006), a role he reprised in its sequels Undisputed III: Redemption (2010), which won him an Action on Film Award for Breakout Action Star, and Boyka: Undisputed (2017), which won him a Jackie Chan Action Movie Award for Best Action Movie Actor.

His early acting credits include minor roles in the Hong Kong films The Accidental Spy (2001), Black Mask 2: City of Masks (2002), and The Medallion (2003), and the American films Special Forces (2003), Unleashed (2005), and The Pink Panther (2006). His first lead role was as Casey Bowman in the American martial arts film Ninja (2009), a role he reprised in the sequel Ninja: Shadow of a Tear (2013). He has since been cast in several mainstream films in supporting roles, such as The Expendables 2, Zero Dark Thirty (both 2012), Ip Man 4: The Finale (2019), and John Wick: Chapter 4 (2023), though most of his lead roles have been in direct-to-video films or limited theatrical releases, such as Close Range (2015), Savage Dog (2017), Accident Man (2018), Triple Threat, Avengement (both 2019), Legacy of Lies (2020), Castle Falls (2021), and Accident Man: Hitman's Holiday (2022).

Adkins has been practising martial arts since the age of 13, when he took up taekwondo; he earned his black belt at age 19. He is also trained in the styles of judo, kickboxing, capoeira, Krav Maga, Jeet Kune Do (JKD), and Wushu.

== Early life ==
Scott Edward Adkins was born into a family of butchers in Sutton Coldfield on 17 June 1976. He first became interested in martial arts at the age of ten, when he visited a local Judo club with his father and older brother.

Adkins was inspired by Jackie Chan, Bruce Lee, Sylvester Stallone, Arnold Schwarzenegger, Jean-Claude Van Damme, and Steven Seagal.

== Career ==
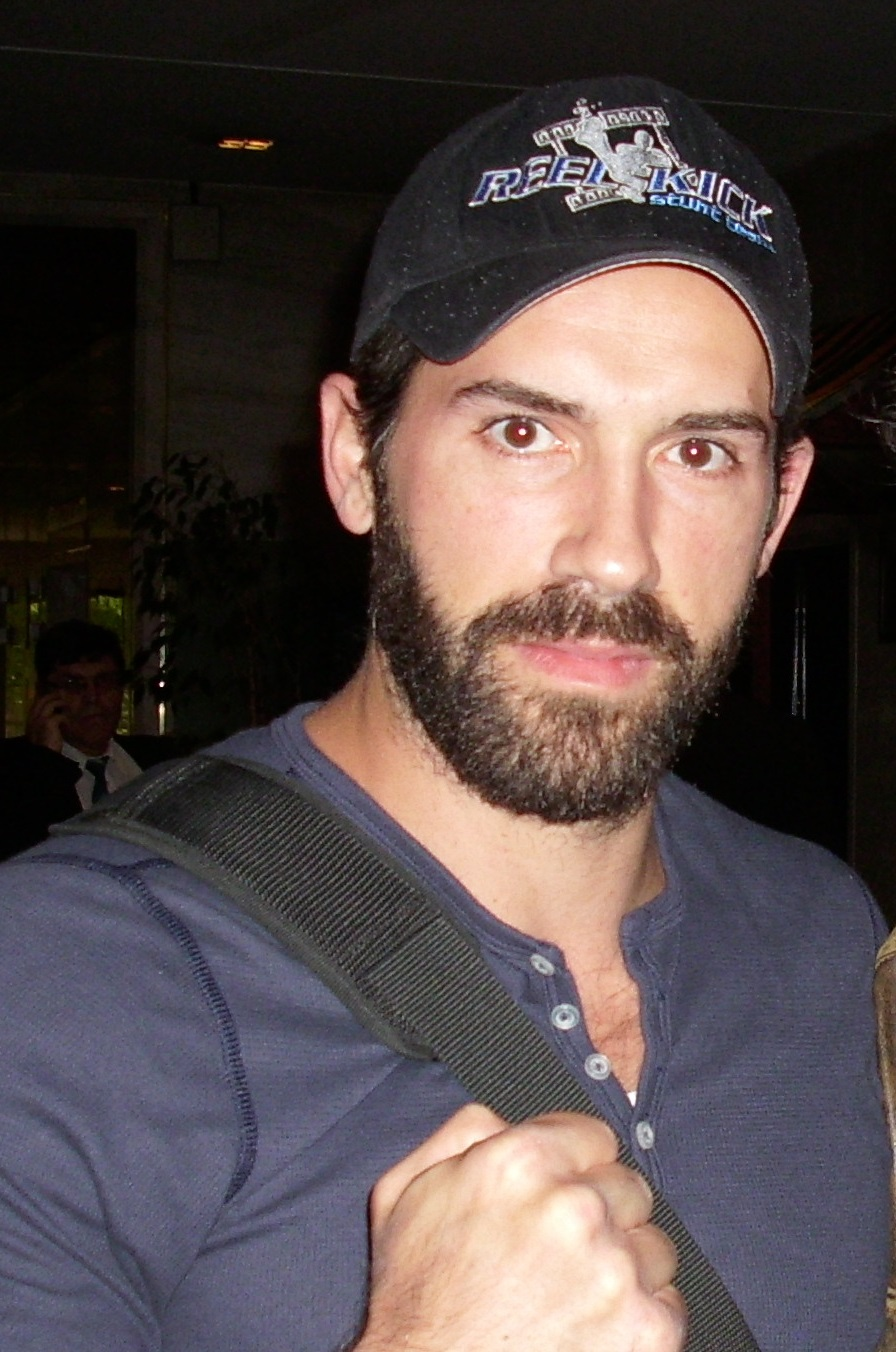
Adkins in 2011

Adkins had a role in a Hong Kong martial arts film called Dei Seung Chui Keung (2001), known in English as Extreme Challenge. He was spotted by Head of the Hong Kong Stuntmen Association and director Stephen Tung and British-born Hong Kong movie expert Bey Logan. He worked with Hong Kong cinema action directors Yuen Woo-ping, Corey Yuen, Sammo Hung, and Jackie Chan. He has a guest role in the BBC series Doctors (2000) and appeared in a few episodes of the BBC series Dangerfield (1998), City Central (1999), and EastEnders (2003), and a lead role in the Sky One comedy-drama Mile High (2003), followed by a regular role in BBC's Holby City (2006).

Starring roles in feature films followed with Adkins' portrayal of Talbot in Special Forces (2003) and Yuri Boyka in Undisputed II: Last Man Standing (2006). After this, he had guest starring roles in The Bourne Ultimatum (2007) and The Tournament (2009), and played Jean-Claude Van Damme's main adversary in The Shepherd: Border Patrol (2008). He shared the role of Weapon XI with Ryan Reynolds in X-Men Origins: Wolverine (2009). His first lead role was as Casey Bowman in the American martial arts film Ninja (2009), a role he reprised in the sequel Ninja: Shadow of a Tear (2013).

In 2012, Adkins was cast to star in Métal Hurlant Chronicles, a television adaptation of the French comic book Metal Hurlant. He has worked in four films with Jean-Claude Van Damme: The Shepherd: Border Patrol, Assassination Games (2011), Universal Soldier: Day of Reckoning, and The Expendables 2 (both in 2012). In 2014, he played King Amphitryon in The Legend of Hercules. He worked again with action choreographer Yuen Woo-ping in 2019 when he starred alongside Donnie Yen in Ip Man 4: The Finale as the main antagonist Barton Geddes. He also starred in Day Shift (2022) and John Wick: Chapter 4 (2023).

== Filmography ==
=== Film ===
Year	Title	Role	Notes
2001	The Accidental Spy	Lee's Bodyguard / Turkish Thug Leader	Credited as Scott Edward Adkins
2001	Extreme Challenge	Isac Borman	Direct-to-video
2001	Pure Vengeance	Dany	Short film
2002	Black Mask 2: City of Masks	Dr. Lang	
2003	Special Forces	Talbot	Direct-to-video
2003	The Medallion	Snakehead's Henchman	
2005	Unleashed	Swimming Pool Fighter	
2005	Pit Fighter	Nathan	Direct-to-video
2006	The Pink Panther	Jacquard	
2006	Undisputed II: Last Man Standing	Yuri Boyka	Direct-to-video
2007	The Bourne Ultimatum	CIA Agent Kiley	
2008	The Shepherd: Border Patrol	Karp	Direct-to-video
2008	Stag Night	Carl	Direct-to-video
2009	X-Men Origins: Wolverine	Weapon XI	Shared role with Ryan Reynolds
2009	The Tournament	Yuri Petrov	
2009	Ninja	Casey Bowman	Direct-to-video
2010	Undisputed III: Redemption	Yuri Boyka	Direct-to-video
2011	Assassination Games	Roland Flint	Direct-to-video
2012	El Gringo	The Man	Direct-to-video
2012	The Expendables 2	Hector	
2012	Universal Soldier: Day of Reckoning	John	Direct-to-video
2012	Zero Dark Thirty	CIA SAD/SOG Operative John Simmons	
2013	Legendary	Travis Preston	Direct-to-video
2013	Green Street 3: Never Back Down	Danny Harvey	Direct-to-video
2013	Ninja: Shadow of a Tear	Casey Bowman	Direct-to-video
2014	The Legend of Hercules	King Amphitryon	
2015	Zero Tolerance	Steven	Direct-to-video
2015	Wolf Warrior	Tom Cat	
2015	Close Range	Colton MacReady	Direct-to-video
2015	Re-Kill	Trent Parker	Direct-to-video
2016	Home Invasion	Heflin	Direct-to-video
2016	Jarhead 3: The Siege	Gunny Raines	Direct-to-video
2016	Grimsby	Pavel Lukashenko	
2016	Criminal	CIA Agent Pete Greensleeves	
2016	Hard Target 2	Wes Baylor	Direct-to-video
2016	Doctor Strange	Lucian / Strong Zealot	
2016	Eliminators	Martin Parker / Thomas Mackenzie	Direct-to-video
2017	Savage Dog	Martin Tillman	Direct-to-video
2017	Boyka: Undisputed	Yuri Boyka	Direct-to-video
2017	American Assassin	Victor	
2018	Accident Man	Mike Fallon	Direct-to-video; Also producer and screenwriter
2018	No Surrender	The Crazy One	
2018	The Debt Collector	"Frenchy" French	Direct-to-video
2018	Incoming	Reiser	Direct-to-video
2019	Abduction	Quinn	Direct-to-video
2019	Triple Threat	Collins	
2019	Avengement	Cain Burgess	Direct-to-video
2019	Ip Man 4: The Finale	Gunnery Sergeant Barton Geddes	
2020	Debt Collectors	"Frenchy" French	Direct-to-video
2020	Legacy of Lies	Martin Baxter	Direct-to-video
2020	Seized	Nero	Direct-to-video
2020	Dead Reckoning	Marco	Direct-to-video
2020	The Intergalactic Adventures of Max Cloud	Max Cloud	Direct-to-video
2021	One Shot	Jake Harris	Direct-to-video
2021	Castle Falls	Mike Wade	Direct-to-video
2022	Day Shift	Diran Nazarian	
2022	Section Eight	Leonard Locke	Direct-to-video
2022	Accident Man: Hitman's Holiday	Mike Fallon	Direct-to-video; Also producer, screenwriter and fight choreographer
2023	John Wick: Chapter 4	Killa Harkan	
2023	Wherever You Go	Joseph	Direct-to-video
2024	One More Shot	Jake Harris	Direct-to-video
2024	Lights Out	Don "The Reaper" Richter	
2024	The Killer's Game	Angus Mackenzie	
2024	Take Cover	Sam Lorde	Direct-to-video
2025	Day of Reckoning	Kyle Rusk	
2025	Diablo	Kris Chaney	Theatrical release in US, Brazil and across the Middle-East
2025	Prisoner of War	James Wright	Direct-to-video
2026	The Rip	FBI Agent Del Byrne	
2026	Reckless	Devon	Direct-to-video
2026	One Last Shot	Jake Harris	Direct-to-video
2026	Skyline: Warpath †	Eric Corley	
TBA	Brawler †	Warren "Trouble" James	Also director

Key
†	Denotes films that have not yet been released

=== Television ===
Year	Title	Role	Notes
1998	Dangerfield		Episode: "Paths"
1999	City Central	Jake Clanton	Episode: "Life Liberty and Pursuit"
2000	Doctors	Ross	3 episodes
2001	The Big Breakfast	Himself	1 episode
2002	Mutant X	Marko	Uncredited; Episode: "Sign from Above"
2003	EastEnders	Joel	6 episodes
2005	Mile High	Ed Russell	12 episodes
2005	Hollyoaks: Let Loose	Ryan	2 episodes
2006	Holby City	Bradley Hume	9 episodes
2012–2014	Métal Hurlant Chronicles	Guillame / Joe Manda	3 episodes

=== Video games ===
Year	Title	Role	Notes
2025	Marvel's Deadpool VR	Omega Red	Voice

== Awards and nominations ==
Year	Nominated work	Award	Category	Results
2010	Undisputed III: Redemption	Action On Film International Film Festival	Breakout Action Star	Won
2017	Boyka: Undisputed	Jackie Chan Action Movie Awards	Best Fight	Won
2017	Boyka: Undisputed	Jackie Chan Action Movie Awards	Best Action Movie Actor	Won
