= Joe Egan (boxer) =

Irish boxer (born 1965)

Personal information
- Nickname: Lord of the rings
- Born: 1965 (age 60–61) Dublin, Ireland
- Height: 185 cm (6 ft 1 in)
- Weight: Heavyweight

Boxing career
- Reach: 6'1"

Boxing record
- Total fights: 16
- Wins: 13
- Win by KO: 0
- Losses: 3
- Draws: 0
- No contests: 0

Joe Egan (born 1965), nicknamed Big Joe, is an Irish retired professional boxer.

== Boxing career ==
Egan was a participant in Dublin's Phoenix Club as an amateur boxer. Egan has won the Irish Heavyweight Boxing championship seven times.

== Other ventures ==
Egan appeared in the 2009 film Sherlock Holmes. Egan was dubbed “toughest white man on the planet” by boxing legend Mike Tyson.

In 2009, Egan published his autobiography Big Joe Egan: The Toughest White Man on the Planet.
