= The Debt Collector (2018 film) =

- Directed by: Jesse V. Johnson
- Starring: Scott Adkins; Louis Mandylor
- Release date: June 5, 2018 (United States)
- Running time: 96 minutes
- Countries: United States; United Kingdom
- Language: English

The Debt Collector is a 2018 action drama film directed by Jesse V. Johnson and starring Scott Adkins and Louis Mandylor.

== Cast ==
- Scott Adkins as "Frenchy" French
- Michael Paré as Alex "Mad Alex"
- Tony Todd as Barbosa
- Louis Mandylor as Sulinski "Golden Boy" Baker / "Sue"
- Vladimir Kulich as Thomas "Big Tommy" Kowolski
- Robert Rusler as Tarva
- Selina Lo as Sandy
- David William No as Roger

== Release ==
The film was released in the United States on June 5, 2018.

== Reception ==
The film has a 100% rating on Rotten Tomatoes based on five reviews. Linda Cook of the Quad-City Times awarded the film three stars.

Noel Murray of the Los Angeles Times gave the film a positive review and wrote that it “isn’t great, but it’s an ideal vehicle for Adkins, who gets to spend almost the entire film cracking skulls or chatting with a mate.”

== Sequel ==
The film spawned a sequel titled Debt Collectors (2020).
