= Ten Pieces =

Ten Pieces is a music education scheme created by journalist Katy Jones for BBC Music which began with a namesake film hosted by Barney Harwood (and other BBC celebrities) created for CBBC that originally aired on 3 October 2014. The film serves as an introduction to classical music for children and is, in that respect, similar to the Fantasia films (even including some of the pieces that were featured in them). But unlike Fantasia, the music is set to a live BBC National Orchestra of Wales rather than animation.

== Programme ==
=== Ten Pieces I - Primary ===
The first in the series, Ten Pieces I was released in 2014.

- Mars by Gustav Holst, hosted by Dick and Dom
- In the Hall of the Mountain King by Edvard Grieg, hosted by Dan Starkey
- Night on the Bare Mountain by Modest Mussorgsky, hosted by Dan Starkey
- Short Ride in a Fast Machine by John Adams, hosted by Khalil Madovi
- "Storm" from Peter Grimes by Benjamin Britten, hosted by The Dumping Ground's Leanne Dunstan and Sarah Rayson
- Symphony No. 5 (first movement) by Ludwig van Beethoven, hosted by Barney Harwood
- Horn Concerto No. 4 (third movement) by Wolfgang Amadeus Mozart, hosted by Katy B
- Zadok the Priest by George Frideric Handel, hosted by Laura Mvula
- Connect It, original body percussion piece created and hosted by Anna Meredith with Dev Griffin. Choreographed by David Ogle
- The Firebird Suite by Igor Stravinsky, hosted by Claudia Winkleman

==== Proms version ====
A Ten Pieces Prom was performed in early July 2015 and was broadcast on CBBC as "CBBC @ the Ten Pieces Prom" on 2 August 2015. Barney, Dan and Dick & Dom were the only celebrities from the film to appear in the prom version with Friday Download's Molly Rainford as the only new celebrity to host the prom alongside them. The program order below is as seen on the televised version.

- Mars
- Symphony No. 5
- Short Ride in a Fast Machine
- "Storm" from Peter Grimes - dance performed by the boys of St. Joseph's College, Ipswich
- Zadok the Priest - choir performed by the Ten Pieces Children's Choir.
- Connect It
- Night on the Bare Mountain
- Horn Concerto No. 4
- Volcano, Equinox and 6/Ten Pieces - New pieces created exclusively for the prom by (in order) Chase Bridge Primary School, Twickenham; St. Mary's Primary School, Maguiresbridge and Withycombe Raleigh Primary School, Exmouth.
- In the Hall of the Mountain King
- The Firebird Suite

=== Ten Pieces II - Secondary ===
The BBC announced a sequel to Ten Pieces to be used in secondary schools. Called Ten Pieces II, this film was originally aimed at pupils aged 11+ and premiered in 2015. The film itself first aired on 26 December 2015. This time, it was hosted by BBC Radio 1's Clara Amfo, with the music performed by the BBC Philharmonic and is dedicated to Katy Jones who died of a brain haemorrhage. Using a mix of live action and animation, each piece is introduced by a celebrity presenter.

- Ride of the Valkyries by Richard Wagner, hosted by Christopher Eccleston
- Concerto for Turntables and Orchestra (fifth movement), hosted by Clara Amfo with composer Gabriel Prokofiev.
- Carmen Suite (Habanera and Toreador Song) by Georges Bizet, hosted by Naomi Wilkinson and Bobby Lockwood
- Trumpet Concerto (third movement) by Joseph Haydn, hosted by Dion Dublin
- Symphony No. 10 (second movement) by Dmitri Shostakovich, hosted by Lemn Sissay
- Toccata and Fugue (both organ and orchestral versions) by Johann Sebastian Bach, hosted by James May with Wayne Marshall
- The Lark Ascending by Ralph Vaughan Williams, hosted by Molly Rainford
- Night Ferry by Anna Clyne, hosted by Doc Brown
- Requiem - Dies Irae by Giuseppe Verdi, hosted by Vikki Stone
- Symphonic Dances from West Side Story (Mambo) by Leonard Bernstein, hosted by Pixie Lott

The segments of Ten Pieces II were later split into separate shorts under the name Ten Little Pieces. shown throughout the week of 30 May 2016 to 3 June 2016.

==== Proms version ====
Like with the first film, a Ten Pieces II prom was performed late July 2016 and was shown through live stream on BBC Red Button on 24 July 2016. With coverage from Michelle Ackerley, presenters Naomi Wilkinson, Dion Dublin and Lemn Sissay return from the film to host the prom, alongside Dan Starkey as a fictionalized version of Haydn, whilst also featuring a sub-plot involving Ride of the Valkyries in which Leah Boleto from Newsround also appeared. A televised version, "CBBC @ the Ten Pieces II Prom", aired on 11 September 2016. The program below is as seen on live stream.

- Toccata and Fugue (organ version)
- Symphony No. 10 - dance performed by the Wildern School of Southampton
- Fluto no uto (Flute song) - New piece created exclusively for the Prom and performed by brother and sister Micheal and Yasmin from Hestercombe Centre for Young Musicians, Somerset
- Match of the Day theme - comedy routine
- Trumpet Concerto - trumpet performed by Matilda Lloyd
- Carmen Suite: Habanera - performed by the Greater Manchester Music Hub
- Requiem - Dies Irae - performed by the Ten Pieces Children's Choir
- Supersonic - New piece created exclusively for the Prom and performed by the Able Orchestra
- Concerto for Turntables and Orchestra - performed by DJ Mr Switch
- The Lark Ascending - performed by Esther Yoo
- Night Ferry
- The Tables Have Been Turned - New piece created for the Prom and performed by the Animate Orchestra
- Ride of the Valkyries
- Symphonic Dances from West Side Story (Mambo)

=== Ten Pieces III - For 7-14s ===
New teaching resources for the third phase of the project were released in September and October 2017. The resources for 7–14 year-olds include short films presented by Lemn Sissay and CBBC's Naomi Wilkinson, classroom lesson plans and simplified arrangements.

- No Place Like by Kerry Andrew
- Anthology of Fantastic Zoology – Sprite; A Bao A Qu by Mason Bates
- Symphony No. 1 in G major – Allegro (1st movement) by Joseph Bologne, Chevalier de Saint-Georges
- Rodeo - Hoe-Down by Aaron Copland
- Symphony No. 9 in E minor, 'From the New World’ – Largo (2nd movement) by Antonín Dvořák
- ‘Enigma’ Variations – Theme (Enigma), variations 11, 6 & 7 by Edward Elgar
- Carmina Burana - 'O fortuna' by Carl Orff
- Abdelazer – Rondeau by Henry Purcell
- Finlandia by Jean Sibelius
- The Nutcracker - Waltz of the Flowers and Russian Dance by Pyotr Ilyich Tchaikovsky
