= Debt Collectors (film) =

- Directed by: Jesse V. Johnson
- Starring: Scott Adkins; Louis Mandylor
- Distributed by: Samuel Goldwyn Films
- Release date: May 29, 2020
- Running time: 97 minutes
- Country: United States
- Language: English

Debt Collectors is a 2020 American action comedy film directed by Jesse V. Johnson and starring Scott Adkins and Louis Mandylor. It is the sequel to the 2018 film The Debt Collector.

== Cast ==
- Scott Adkins as "Frenchy" French
- Louis Mandylor as Sulinski "Golden Boy" Baker / "Sue"
- Vladimir Kulich as Thomas "Big Tommy" Kowolski
- Mayling Ng as Britt
- Catherine Black as Waitress
- Josef Cannon as Evo
- Jermaine Jacox as Darius
- Mike Maolucci as Vaughan
- Marina Sirtis as Mallory "Mal" Reese
- Ski Carr as "Molly X" (credited as Louie Ski Carr)

== Release ==
The film was released on VOD via Samuel Goldwyn Films on May 29, 2020. Then it was released on DVD in June 2020.

== Reception ==
The film has an 82% rating on Rotten Tomatoes based on 11 reviews. Simon Abrams of RogerEbert.com awarded the film two stars out of four. Linda Cook of the Quad-City Times awarded the film three stars.

Peter Martin of ScreenAnarchy gave the film a positive review, calling it “an old-school action flick with plenty of bashing and brotherhood.”
