= Fire It Up (Joe Cocker album) =

Studio album by Joe Cocker
- Released: 6 November 2012
- Studio: Emblem Studios (Calabasas, California)
- Genre: Rock, blues
- Length: 42:32
- Label: Columbia (Europe)
- Producer: Matt Serletic

Joe Cocker chronology
Icon (2011)	Fire It Up (2012)	Fire It Up - Live (2013)

Singles from Fire It Up
- 1. "Fire It Up" Released: 7 September 2012; 2. "I Come in Peace" Released: 1 February 2013

Professional ratings
Review scores
Source	Rating
AllMusic	2/5 stars

Fire It Up is the twenty-second and final studio album by English singer Joe Cocker, released on 6 November 2012 by Sony/Columbia in Europe. It was recorded at Emblem Studios Calabasas, California and, like Cocker's previous album, Hard Knocks, it was produced by Matt Serletic. The album was released as a regular jewel case edition as well as a premium edition with an additional DVD.

== Track listing ==
1. "Fire It Up" (Alan Frew, Johnny Reid, Marty Dodson) - 3:53
2. "I'll Be Your Doctor" (Jeff Trott, Victoria Horn, Steven McMorran) - 3:32
3. "You Love Me Back" (Steve Diamond, Stephanie Bentley, Dennis Matkosky) - 3:55
4. "I Come in Peace" (Rick Brewster, Ross Wilson) - 4:20
5. "You Don't Need a Million Dollars" (Rob Giles) - 3:56
6. "Eye on the Prize" (Marc Broussard, Courtlan Clement, Chad Gilmore, De Marco Johnson, Jamie Kenney, Calvin Turner) - 4:09
7. "Younger" (Gary Burr) - 4:13
8. "You Don't Know What You're Doing to Me" (Tyler Hilton, Wayne Kirkpatrick) - 3:52
9. "The Letting Go" (Charlie Evans, Joss Stone, Graham Lyle) - 3:30
10. "I'll Walk in the Sunshine Again" (Keith Urban) - 3:14
11. "Weight of the World" (Kevin Bowe, Joe Stark) - 3:59
12. "The Last Road" (Matt Serletic, Aimée Proal, Dave Katz, Sam Hollander) - 4:04 [Premium edition bonus track]
13. "Walk Through the World with Me" (Marc Cohn, John Leventhal) - 4:20 [Premium edition bonus track]
14. "Let Love Decide" (Gary Barlow, Jeffrey Steele) - 2:50 (bonus track) [iTunes bonus track]

Premium edition DVD (Directed by Cole Walliser and filmed in Los Angeles, Sept 2012)

1. "Fire It Up" (Alan Frew, Johnny Reid, Marty Dodson)
2. "I'll Be Your Doctor" (Jeff Trott, Victoria Horn, Steve McMorran)
3. "You Love Me Back" (Steve Diamond, Stephanie Bentley, Dennis Matkosky)
4. "Eye on the Prize" (Marc Broussard, Courtlan Clement, Chad Gilmore, De Marco Johnson, Jamie Kenney, Calvin Turner)
5. "I Come in Peace" (Rick Brewster, Ross Wilson)
6. "You Don't Need a Million Dollars" (Rob Giles)

Line-up: Joe Cocker – lead vocals; Nick Milo and Steve Grove – keyboards; Gene Black – guitars; Oneida James-Rebeccu – bass; Jack Bruno – drums; Nikki Tillman and Kara Britz – backing vocals

== Personnel ==
- Joe Cocker – vocals
- Jamie Muhoberac – keyboards
- Matt Serletic – keyboards, programming, horn arrangements (2, 9)
- Alex Arias – additional programming
- Mike Finnigan – Hammond B3 organ (4), backing vocals (4)
- Ray Parker Jr. – guitars (1–5, 8–11)
- Joel Shearer – guitars (1, 4–11)
- Tim Pierce – guitars (2–4)
- Tom Bukovac – guitars (6, 10)
- Chris Chaney – bass
- Dorian Crozier – drums, percussion
- Cleto Escobedo III – baritone saxophone (2, 9)
- George Shelby – alto saxophone (2, 9), tenor saxophone (2, 9)
- Jeff Babko – trombone (2, 9)
- John Daversa – trumpet (2, 9)
- Jamie Hovorka – trumpet (2, 9)
- RDVZ A Capella Group: Melanie Fernandez, Richie Ferris, Jeremy Hitch, Anh Nguyen, Melinda Porto and Nicholas Tubbs – backing vocals (1, 4, 5, 10)
- Sheree Brown – backing vocals (2, 3, 11)
- Mabvuto Carpenter – backing vocals (2, 11)
- Ayana Williams – backing vocals (2, 11)
- Kara Britz – backing vocals (3, 4)
- Julia Tillman Waters – backing vocals (6)
- Maxine Waters Willard – backing vocals (6)

== Production ==
- Matt Serletic – producer
- James Brown – recording
- Ryan Hewitt – recording
- Doug Trantow – additional engineer, Pro Tools editing
- Alex Arias – assistant engineer, Pro Tools recording
- Ryan Kern – assistant engineer, Pro Tools recording, music copyist
- Mike Leisz – assistant engineer, Pro Tools recording
- Eryk Rich – assistant engineer
- Nigel Lundemo – Pro Tools recording
- Jim "Bud" Monti – Pro Tools recording
- Chris Lord-Alge – mixing at Mix LA (Los Angeles, California)
- Andrew Schubert – additional mixing, mix assistant
- Brad Townsend – additional mixing, mix assistant
- Ted Jensen – mastering at Sterling Sound (New York City, New York)
- Kelli Musgrave – production coordinator
- Ryan Corey – design
- Jeri Heiden – art direction, additional photography
- Cole Walliser – photography
- Albert Mendonca – photography styling
- Roger Davies – management
- Ray Neapolitan – management
- Shady Farshadfar – management
- Lisa Garrett – management
- Irene Taylor – management

== Charts ==
Chart performance for Fire It Up
Chart (2012–2013)	Peak position
Australian Albums (ARIA)	109
Austrian Albums (Ö3 Austria)	9
Belgian Albums (Ultratop Flanders)	63
Belgian Albums (Ultratop Wallonia)	59
Dutch Albums (Album Top 100)	32
French Albums (SNEP)	128
German Albums (Offizielle Top 100)	5
Swiss Albums (Schweizer Hitparade)	5
UK Albums (Official Charts)	17

== Certifications ==
Region	Certification	Certified units/sales
Germany (BVMI)	3× Gold	300,000^{‡}
^{‡} Sales+streaming figures based on certification alone.
