= Triple J Magazine =

Australian music magazine

- Categories: Alternative music and culture
- Frequency: Annual (before ceased)
- Publisher: News Custom Publishing (News Corp)
- First issue: 2005
- Final issue: Annual 2016
- Company: Australian Broadcasting Corporation
- Country: Australia
- Based in: Melbourne, Victoria
- Language: English

Triple J Magazine (stylised in all lowercase) was an Australian music magazine associated with the Australian Broadcasting Corporation's youth radio station Triple J. It was independently owned and published for ABC Magazines by News Custom Publishing from 2005 to 2013 before being published annually in-house until 2016.

Founded as jmag in April 2005, the magazine was initially published quarterly. Content included reviews for music, TV shows and movies, interviews with musicians and presenters on the station, Triple J Unearthed profiles, and annual lists of Hottest 100 countdowns. Due to the magazine's success, new issues were published monthly from 2007. The publication underwent a rebranding in August 2010 to incorporate the Triple J logo and full name in its masthead. At the end of 2012, a one-off annual edition was issued, the first of its kind. From August 2012, Triple J Magazine was published bi-monthly, until mid-2013 when it was dropped by News Custom Publishing. Staff of the magazine were made redundant, though Triple J assured customers it would become an annual print, published in-house. Three final editions, issued at the end of 2014, 2015 and 2016 respectively, were issued.
