= 2007 Scream Awards =

2007 USA film awards

2nd Scream Awards
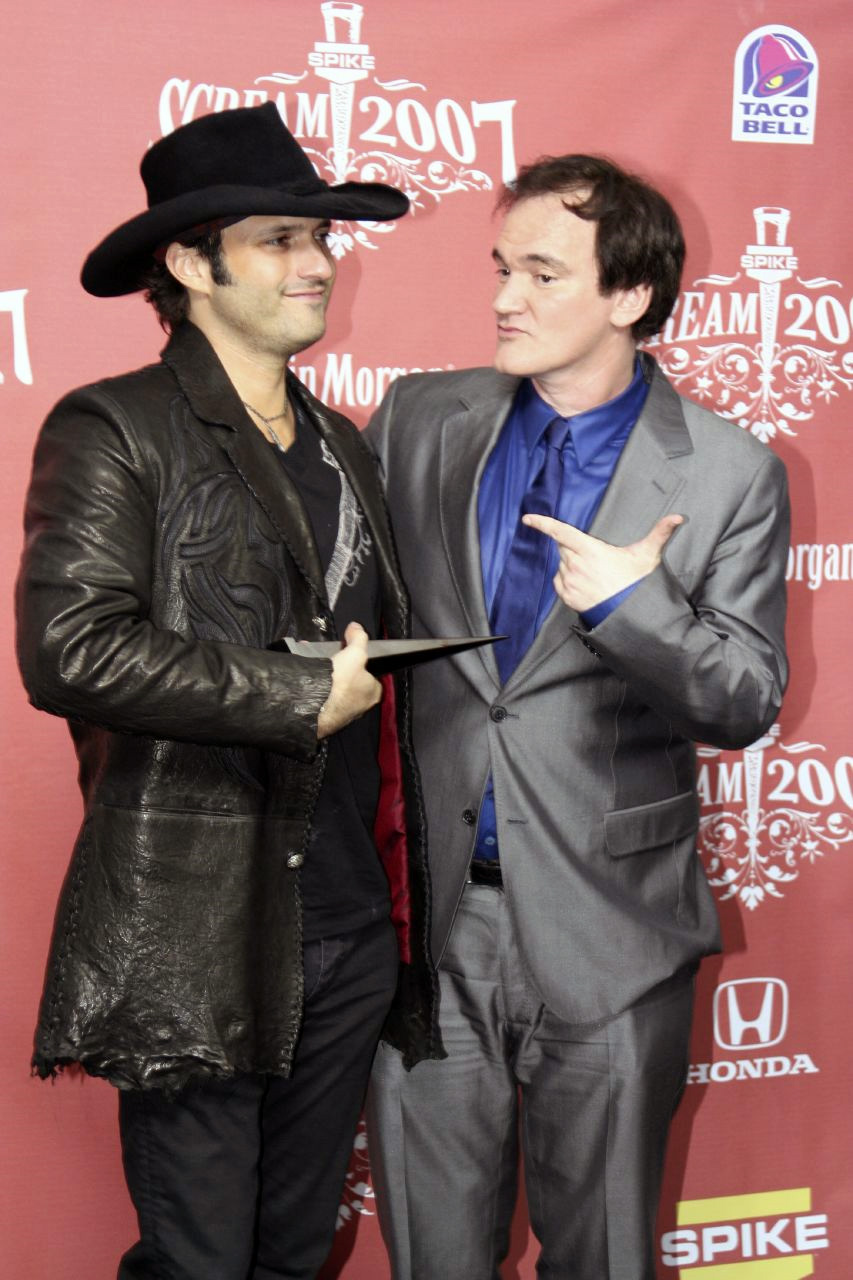
- Robert Rodriguez and Quentin Tarantino at the 2007 Scream Awards.
- Announced on: October 23, 2007
- Presented on: October 19, 2007
- Site: www.spike.com

Highlights
- Most awards: Transformers
- Most nominations: 300

Television coverage
- Network: Spike TV

Billed as Scream 2007, the 2007 ceremony of the Scream Awards, run by Spike TV, was the second annual iteration of these awards, and the first to be held under the "Scream + Year" relabelling. The awards ceremony was held on Friday, October 19, 2007 at the Greek Theatre in Los Angeles and it was aired on Spike TV on the following Tuesday (October 23, 2007).

== World premieres ==
Movie Premiers
Content Premiered	Presenters
Sweeney Todd: The Demon Barber of Fleet Street	Tim Burton
Beowulf	Neil Gaiman, Ray Winstone and Roger Avery
Repo! The Genetic Opera	Anthony Stewart Head, Bill Moseley and Paris Hilton
The Mist	Thomas Jane

== Performances ==
Movie Premiers
Artist	Performance
Ozzy Osbourne	"Not Going Away"
Avenged Sevenfold	"Scream"
"The Monsters of Rock" (Alice Cooper, Rob Zombie and Slash)	Alice Cooper Medley: "I Love the Dead" and "School's Out"

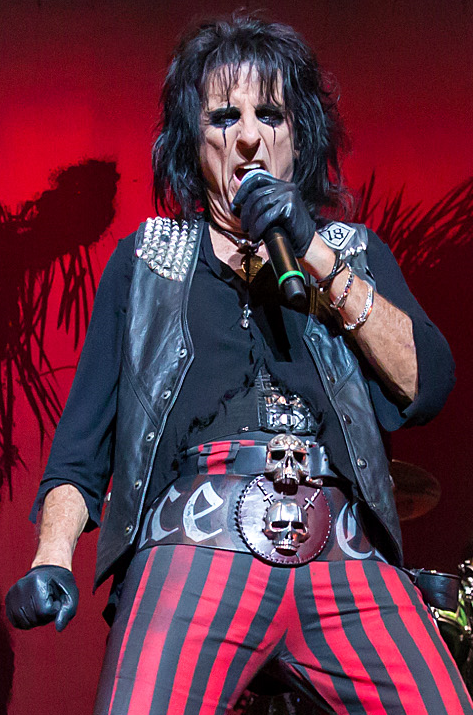
Alice Cooper, American rock singer, at the 2007 Scream Awards

== Competitive categories ==
The winners were chosen by a process of public online voting on the Spike TV website.

The nominee and winners of the 2007 Scream Awards were as follows:

Winners and nominees
Award	Recipient	Result
Ultimate Scream	28 Weeks Later	Nominated
Ultimate Scream	300	Won
Ultimate Scream	Battlestar Galactica	Nominated
Ultimate Scream	The Descent	Nominated
Ultimate Scream	Harry Potter and the Order of the Phoenix	Nominated
Ultimate Scream	Heroes	Nominated
Ultimate Scream	Pan's Labyrinth	Nominated
Ultimate Scream	Pirates of the Caribbean: At World's End	Nominated
Ultimate Scream	Spider-Man 3	Nominated
Ultimate Scream	Transformers	Nominated
Best Horror Movie	28 Weeks Later	Won
Best Horror Movie	1408	Nominated
Best Horror Movie	The Descent	Nominated
Best Horror Movie	Grindhouse	Nominated
Best Horror Movie	The Host	Nominated
Best Horror Movie	Hostel: Part II	Nominated
Best Fantasy Movie	Harry Potter and the Order of the Phoenix	Nominated
Best Fantasy Movie	Pan's Labyrinth	Won
Best Fantasy Movie	Pirates of the Caribbean: At World's End	Nominated
Best Fantasy Movie	Spider-Man 3	Nominated
Best Fantasy Movie	Stardust	Nominated
Best Science Fiction Movie	Children of Men	Nominated
Best Science Fiction Movie	The Fountain	Nominated
Best Science Fiction Movie	The Prestige	Nominated
Best Science Fiction Movie	Sunshine	Nominated
Best Science Fiction Movie	Transformers	Won
Best TV Show	Battlestar Galactica	Nominated
Best TV Show	Doctor Who	Nominated
Best TV Show	Heroes	Won
Best TV Show	Lost	Nominated
Best TV Show	Masters of Horror	Nominated
Best Comic Book	30 Days of Night	Won
Best Comic Book	All-Star Superman	Nominated
Best Comic Book	The Boys	Nominated
Best Comic Book	Ultimate Fantastic Four	Nominated
Best Comic Book	Y: The Last Man	Nominated
Scream Queen	Kate Beckinsale as Amy Fox, Vacancy	Won
Scream Queen	Jordana Brewster as Chrissie, The Texas Chainsaw Massacre: The Beginning	Nominated
Scream Queen	Rosario Dawson as Abernathy "Abbie" Ross, Grindhouse	Nominated
Scream Queen	Rose McGowan as Cherry Darling, Grindhouse	Nominated
Scream Queen	Bijou Phillips as Whitney Swerling, Hostel: Part II	Nominated
Scream Queen	Mary Elizabeth Winstead as Heather Fitzgerald, Black Christmas	Nominated
Scream King	Shia LaBeouf as Kale Brecht, Disturbia	Won
Scream King	John Cusack as Mike Enslin, 1408	Nominated
Scream King	Samuel L. Jackson, Snakes on a Plane	Nominated
Scream King	Angus Macfadyen as Jeff Denlon, Saw III	Nominated
Scream King	Freddy Rodriguez, Grindhouse	Nominated
Scream King	Luke Wilson as David Fox, Vacancy	Nominated
Best Superhero	Michael Chiklis as The Thing, Fantastic Four: Rise of the Silver Surfer	Nominated
Best Superhero	Chris Evans as Human Torch, Fantastic Four: Rise of the Silver Surfer	Nominated
Best Superhero	Tobey Maguire as Spider-Man, Spider-Man 3	Won
Best Superhero	Masi Oka as Hiro Nakamura, Heroes	Nominated
Best Superhero	Milo Ventimiglia as Peter Petrelli, Heroes	Nominated
Sexiest Superhero	Jessica Alba, Fantastic Four: Rise of the Silver Surfer	Won
Sexiest Superhero	Ali Larter, Heroes	Nominated
Sexiest Superhero	Hayden Panettiere as Claire Bennet, Heroes	Nominated
Fantasy Fox	Jessica Biel, The Illusionist	Won
Fantasy Fox	Kirsten Dunst, Spider-Man 3	Nominated
Fantasy Fox	Lena Headey, 300	Nominated
Fantasy Fox	Keira Knightley, Pirates of the Caribbean: At World's End	Nominated
Fantasy Fox	Evangeline Lilly, Lost	Nominated
Fantasy Fox	Eva Mendes, Ghost Rider	Nominated
Fantasy Fox	Sienna Miller, Stardust	Nominated
Fantasy Hero	Gerard Butler, 300	Nominated
Fantasy Hero	Johnny Depp, Pirates of the Caribbean: At World's End	Won
Fantasy Hero	Matthew Fox, Lost	Nominated
Fantasy Hero	Edward Norton, The Illusionist	Nominated
Fantasy Hero	Daniel Radcliffe, Harry Potter and the Order of the Phoenix	Nominated
Sci-Fi Siren	Clare-Hope Ashitey, Children of Men	Nominated
Sci-Fi Siren	Megan Fox, Transformers	Won
Sci-Fi Siren	Scarlett Johansson, The Prestige	Nominated
Sci-Fi Siren	Katee Sackhoff, Battlestar Galactica	Nominated
Sci-Fi Siren	Rachel Weisz, The Fountain	Nominated
Sci-Fi Star	Christian Bale, The Prestige	Nominated
Sci-Fi Star	Hugh Jackman, The Fountain	Nominated
Sci-Fi Star	Shia LaBeouf, Transformers	Won
Sci-Fi Star	Cillian Murphy, Sunshine	Nominated
Sci-Fi Star	Clive Owen, Children of Men	Nominated
Best Cameo	David Bowie, The Prestige	Nominated
Best Cameo	Jay Hernandez, Hostel: Part II	Nominated
Best Cameo	Keith Richards, Pirates of the Caribbean: At World's End	Won
Best Cameo	Quentin Tarantino, Grindhouse	Nominated
Best Cameo	Bruce Willis, Grindhouse	Nominated
Breakout Performance	Clare-Hope Ashitey, Children of Men	Nominated
Breakout Performance	Zoë Bell, Grindhouse	Nominated
Breakout Performance	Megan Fox, Transformers	Nominated
Breakout Performance	Lauren German, Hostel: Part II	Nominated
Breakout Performance	Shauna MacDonald, The Descent	Nominated
Breakout Performance	Hayden Panettiere, Heroes	Won
Breakout Performance	Rodrigo Santoro, 300	Nominated
Most Vile Villain	Sergi López as Captain Vidal, Pan's Labyrinth	Nominated
Most Vile Villain	Michelle Pfeiffer, Stardust	Nominated
Most Vile Villain	Zachary Quinto as Gabriel Gray/Sylar, Heroes	Nominated
Most Vile Villain	Kurt Russell as Stuntman Mike, Grindhouse	Nominated
Most Vile Villain	Rodrigo Santoro as Xerxes, 300	Nominated
Most Vile Villain	Tobin Bell and Shawnee Smith as Jigsaw Killer, Saw III	Nominated
Most Vile Villain	Thomas Haden Church as Sandman, Spider-Man 3	Nominated
Most Vile Villain	Topher Grace as Eddie Brock/Venom, Spider-Man 3	Nominated
Most Vile Villain	Ralph Fiennes as Lord Voldemort, Harry Potter and the Order of the Phoenix	Won
Most Memorable Mutilation	Battle vs. the Immortals, 300	Nominated
Most Memorable Mutilation	Cranial surgery, Saw III	Nominated
Most Memorable Mutilation	Dismembered in car crash, Grindhouse	Won
Most Memorable Mutilation	Eaten alive by cannibal, Hostel: Part II	Nominated
Most Memorable Mutilation	Mouth sliced open and sewn back together, Pan's Labyrinth	Nominated
Best Comic-to-Screen Adaptation	300	Won
Best Comic-to-Screen Adaptation	Fantastic Four: Rise of the Silver Surfer	Nominated
Best Comic-to-Screen Adaptation	Ghost Rider	Nominated
Best Comic-to-Screen Adaptation	Spider-Man 3	Nominated
Best Comic-to-Screen Adaptation	TMNT	Nominated
Best Sequel	28 Weeks Later	Nominated
Best Sequel	Harry Potter and the Order of the Phoenix	Won
Best Sequel	Pirates of the Caribbean: At World's End	Nominated
Best Sequel	Saw III	Nominated
Best Sequel	Spider-Man 3	Nominated
"Jump-From-Your-Seat" Scene of the Year	Attack of the Uber Immortal, 300	Nominated
"Jump-From-Your-Seat" Scene of the Year	Final battle: Megatron vs. Optimus Prime, Transformers	Won
"Jump-From-Your-Seat" Scene of the Year	Mid-Air battle: Spider-Man vs. The New Goblin, Spider-Man 3	Nominated
"Jump-From-Your-Seat" Scene of the Year	The rain of arrows, 300	Nominated
"Jump-From-Your-Seat" Scene of the Year	Zombie attacks glass window, 28 Weeks Later	Nominated
Best Director	Michael Bay, Transformers	Nominated
Best Director	Danny Boyle, Sunshine	Nominated
Best Director	Alfonso Cuarón, Children of Men	Nominated
Best Director	Guillermo del Toro, Pan's Labyrinth	Nominated
Best Director	Neil Marshall, The Descent	Nominated
Best Director	Eli Roth, Hostel: Part II	Nominated
Best Director	Zack Snyder, 300	Nominated
Best Director	Sam Raimi, Spider-Man 3	Nominated
Best Director	Quentin Tarantino & Robert Rodriguez, Grindhouse	Won
Best Scream-Play	300 written by Zack Snyder and Kurt Johnstad	Nominated
Best Scream-Play	Children of Men written by Alfonso Cuarón, Timothy J. Sexton, David Arata, Mark Fergus, and Hawke Ostby	Nominated
Best Scream-Play	Grindhouse written by Robert Rodriguez, Quentin Tarantino, Jeff Rendell, Eli Roth, Edgar Wright, and Rob Zombie	Won
Best Scream-Play	The Descent written by Neil Marshall	Nominated
Best Scream-Play	Pan's Labyrinth written by Guillermo del Toro	Nominated
Best Scream-Play	Sunshine written by Alex Garland	Nominated
Best F/X	300	Nominated
Best F/X	Harry Potter and the Order of the Phoenix	Nominated
Best F/X	Pirates of the Caribbean: At World's End	Nominated
Best F/X	Spider-Man 3	Nominated
Best F/X	Transformers	Won
Best Foreign Movie	Cello (South Korea)	Nominated
Best Foreign Movie	Death Note (Japan)	Nominated
Best Foreign Movie	The Host (South Korea)	Nominated
Best Foreign Movie	Initial D (Hong Kong)	Nominated
Best Foreign Movie	Pan's Labyrinth (Spain)	Won
Best Comic Book Writer	Brian Michael Bendis, Civil War: The Initiative / Daredevil / New Avengers	Nominated
Best Comic Book Writer	Garth Ennis, Punisher: Max / The Boys / Ghost Rider / Chronicles of Wormwood / Midnight	Nominated
Best Comic Book Writer	Frank Miller, All Star Batman & Robin, the Boy Wonder / Frank Miller's RoboCop	Won
Best Comic Book Writer	Alan Moore, Lost Girls / Yuggoth Cultures	Nominated
Best Comic Book Writer	Brian K. Vaughn, Ex Machina / Runaways / Y: The Last Man	Nominated
Best Comic Book Artist	John Cassaday, Astonishing X-Men	Won
Best Comic Book Artist	Darwyn Cook, The Spirit	Nominated
Best Comic Book Artist	Pia Guerra, Y: The Last Man	Nominated
Best Comic Book Artist	Steve McNiven, Civil War	Nominated
Best Comic Book Artist	Ben Templesmith, Wormwood: Gentleman Corpse/Fell	Nominated
Best Screen-to-Comic Adaptation	28 Days Later: The Aftermath	Won
Best Screen-to-Comic Adaptation	Army of Darkness	Nominated
Best Screen-to-Comic Adaptation	Frank Miller's RoboCop	Nominated
Best Screen-to-Comic Adaptation	George A. Romero's Night of the Living Dead: Back from the Grave	Nominated
Best Screen-to-Comic Adaptation	The Hills Have Eyes: The Beginning	Nominated
Most Shocking Comic Book Twist	Alice in Wonderland and Dorothy from Oz have lesbian sex!, Lost Girls	Nominated
Most Shocking Comic Book Twist	Captain America dies!, Captain America	Won
Most Shocking Comic Book Twist	Peter Parker reveals that he is Spider-Man!, Civil War	Nominated
Most Shocking Comic Book Twist	Sabretooth is beheaded by Wolverine!, Wolverine	Nominated
Most Shocking Comic Book Twist	Superman is killed by Superboy-Prime!, Infinite Crisis	Nominated

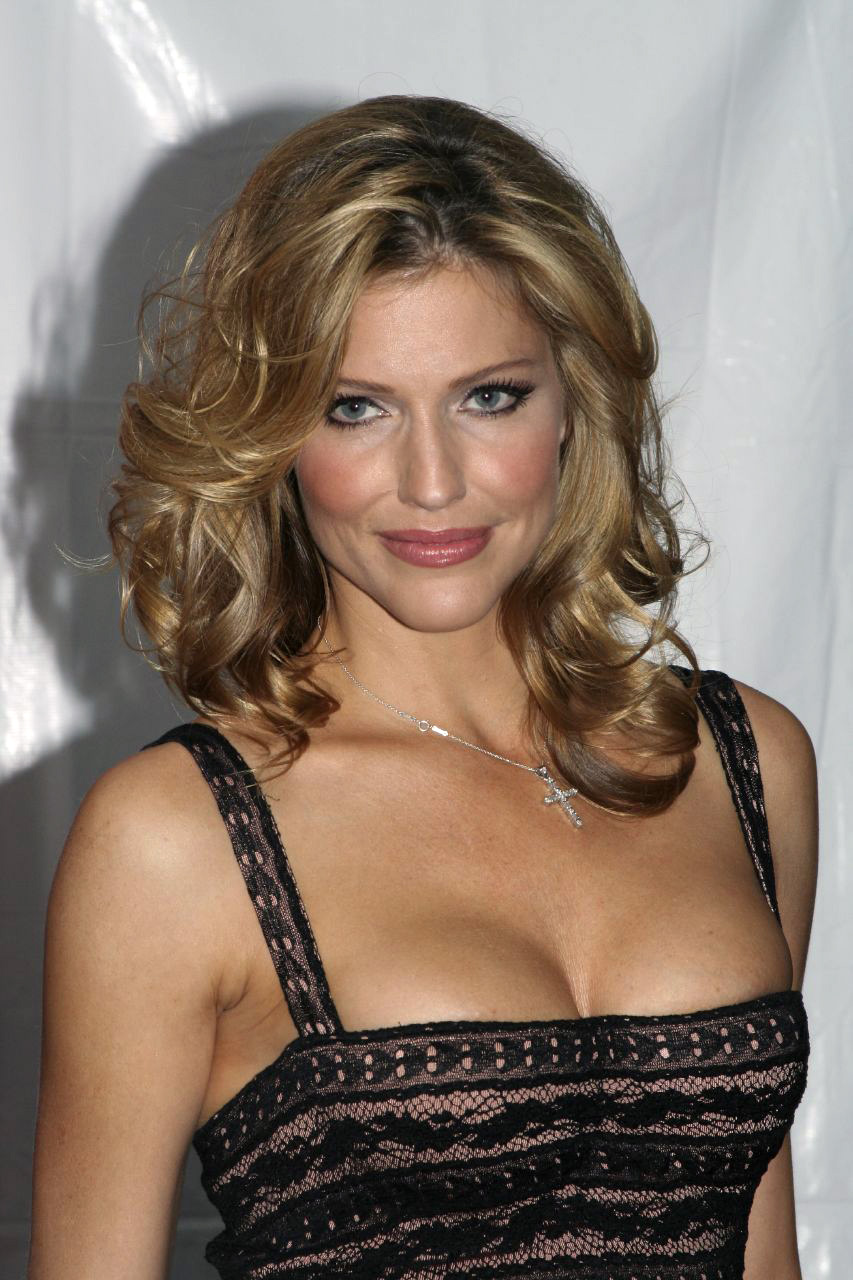
Tricia Helfer at Scream 2007

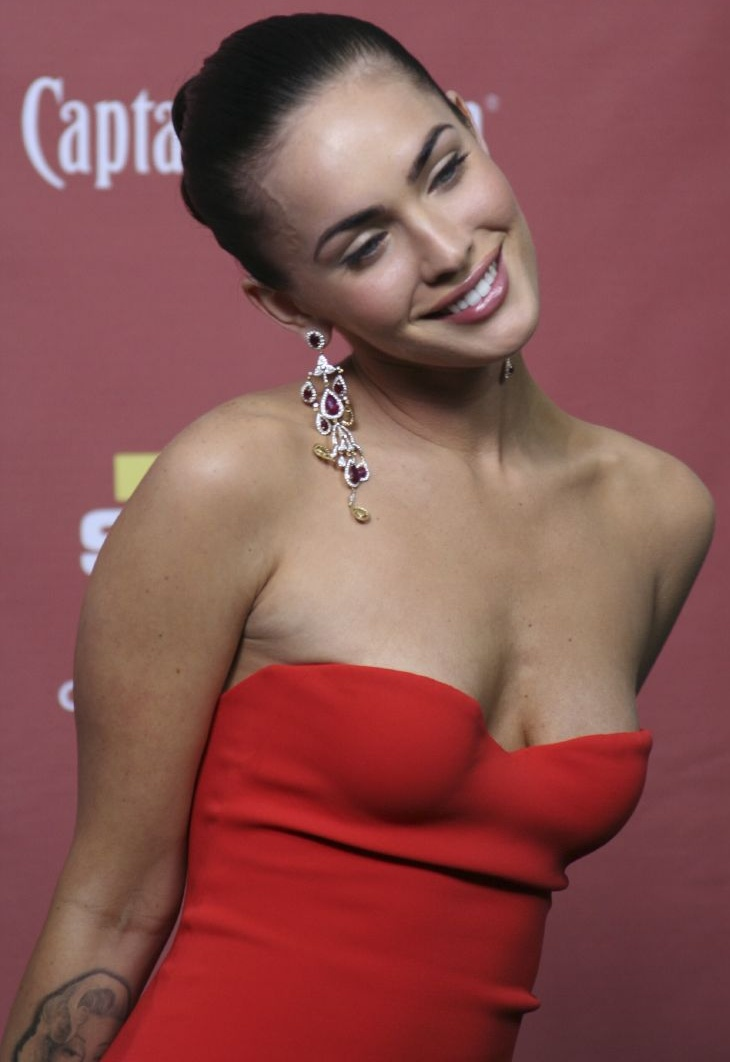
Megan Fox at Scream 2007.

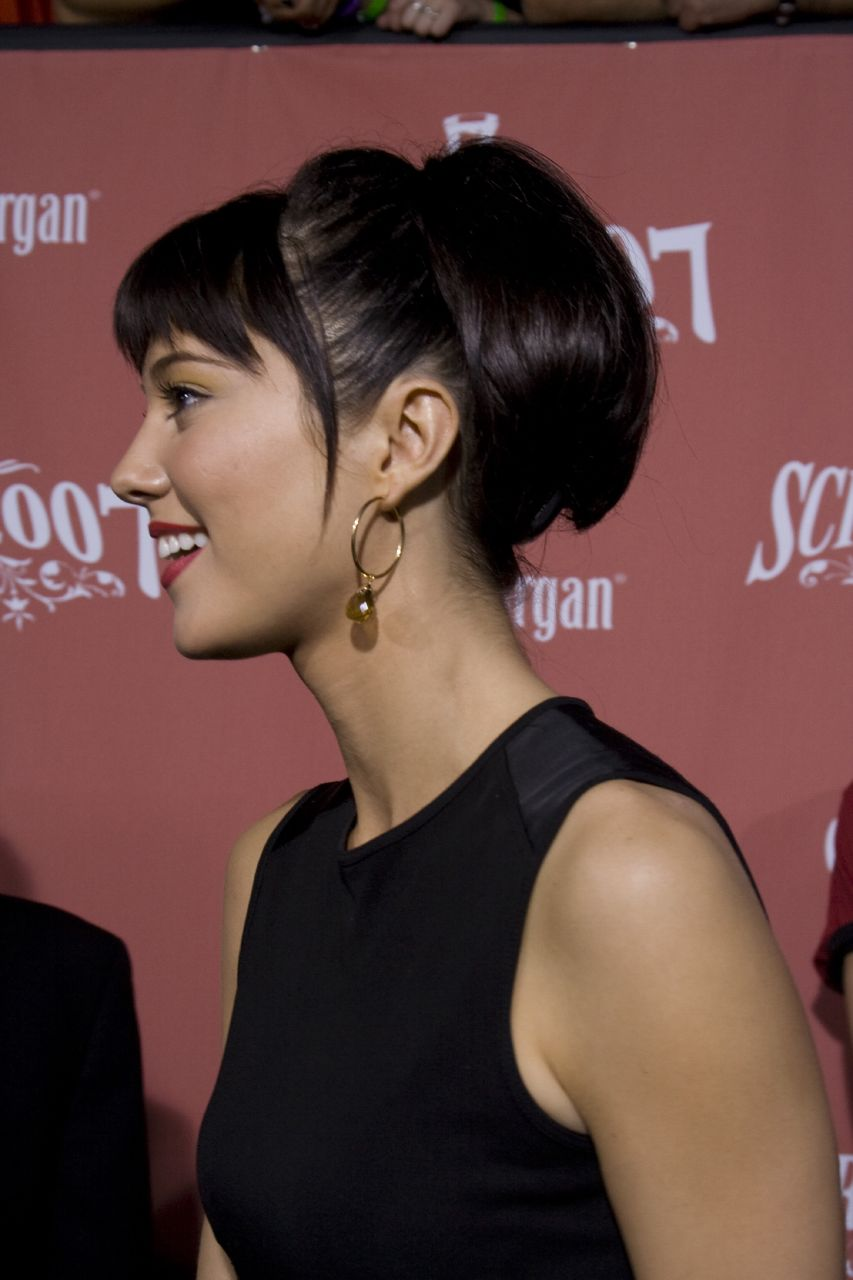
Mary Elizabeth Winstead at Scream 2007.

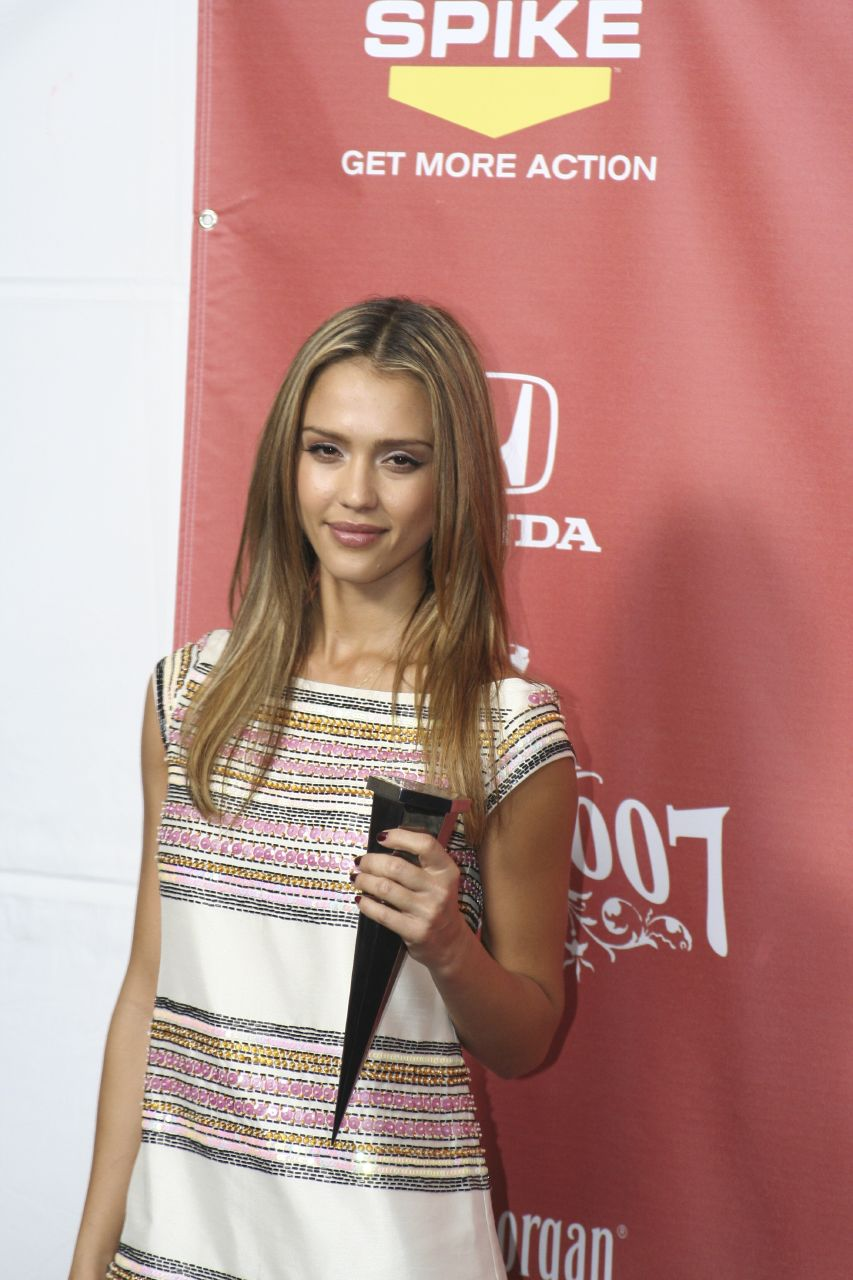
Jessica Alba at Scream 2007.

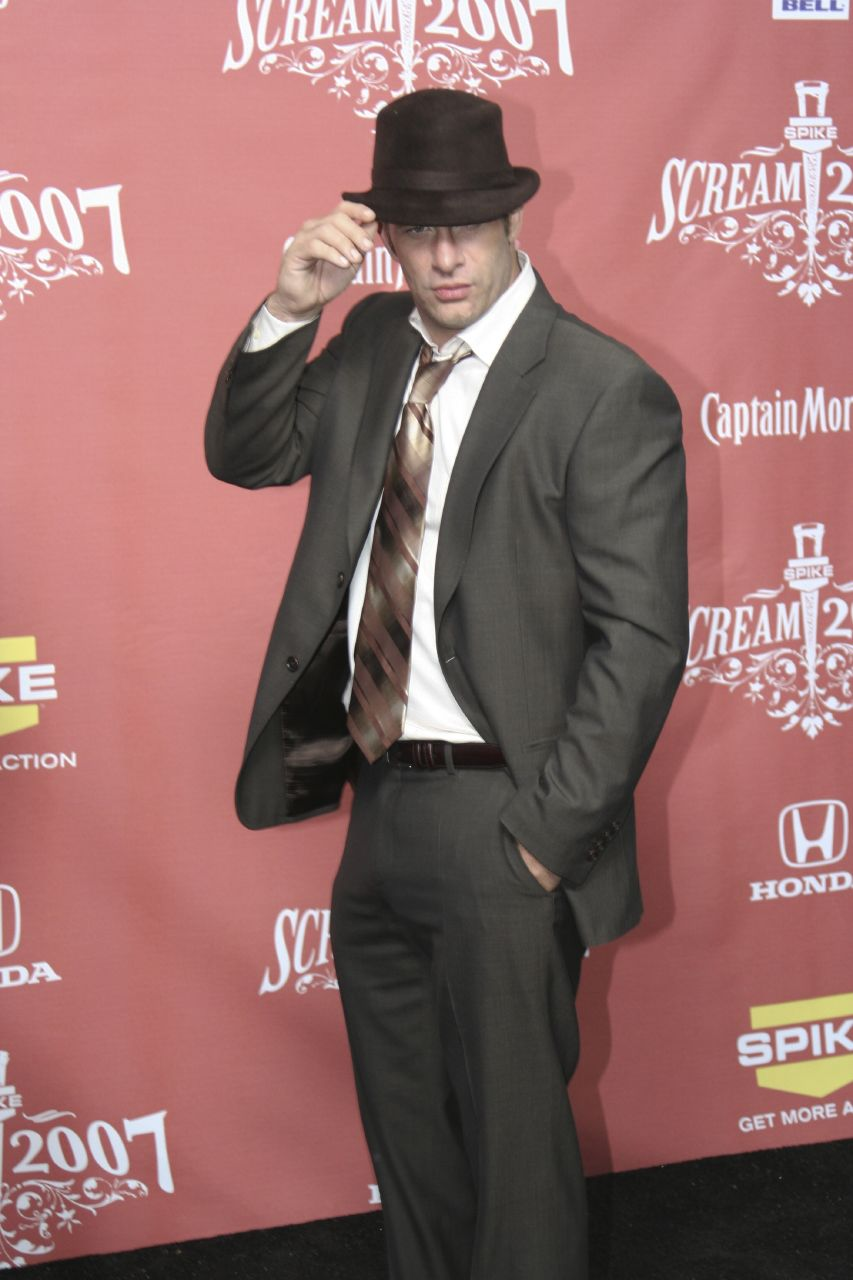
Jane Thomas at Scream 2007.

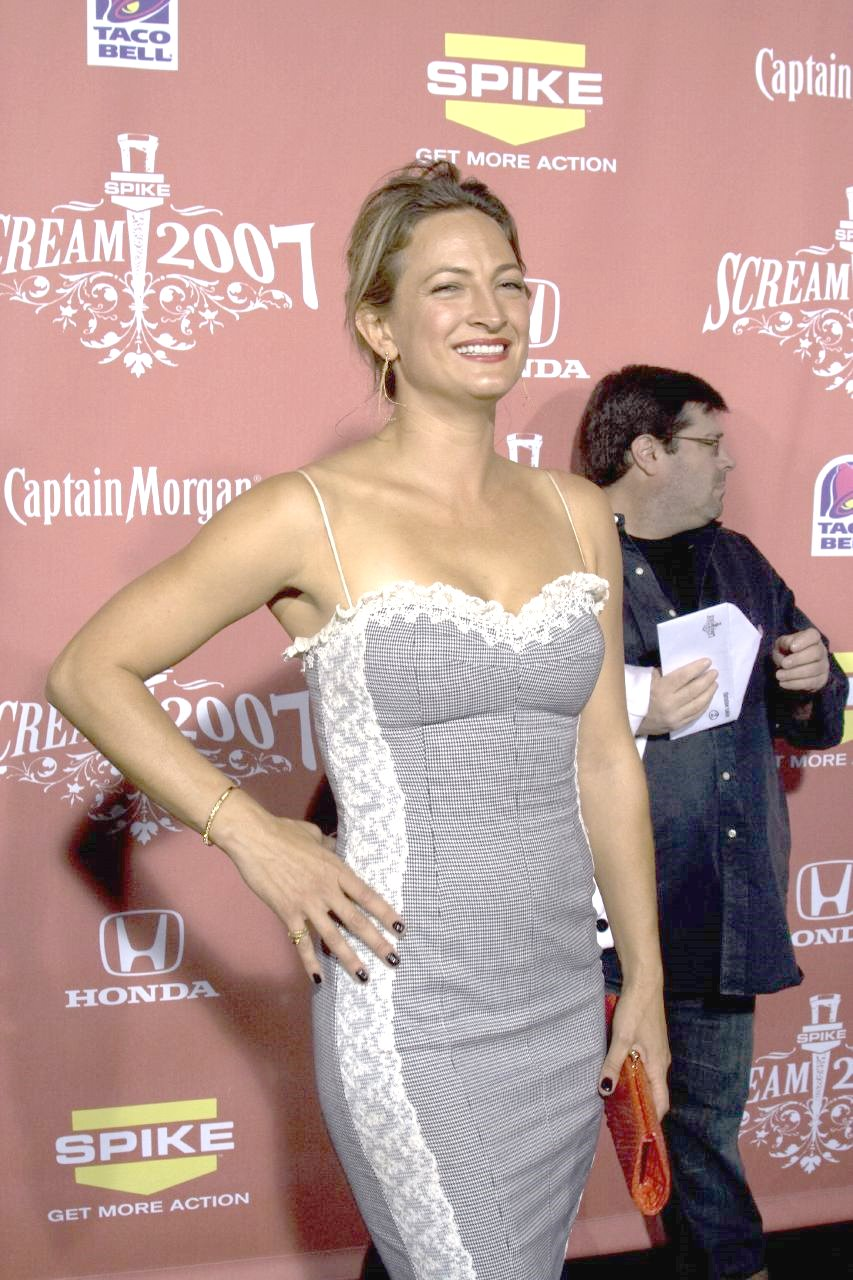
Zoë Bell at Scream 2007.

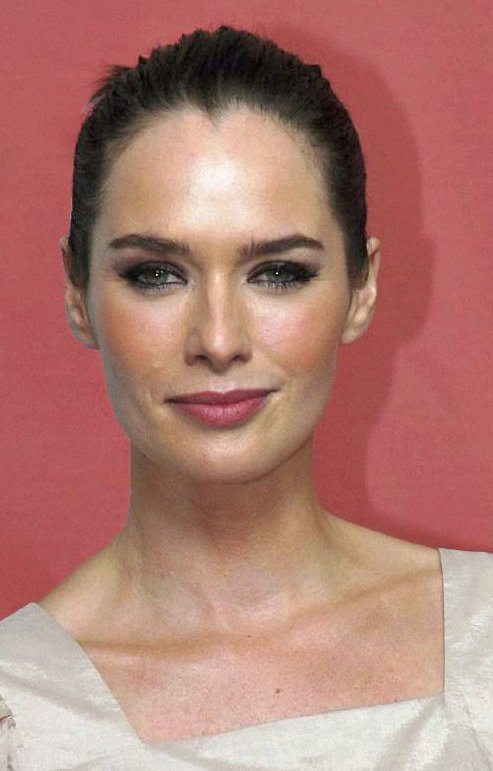
Lena Headey at Scream 2007.

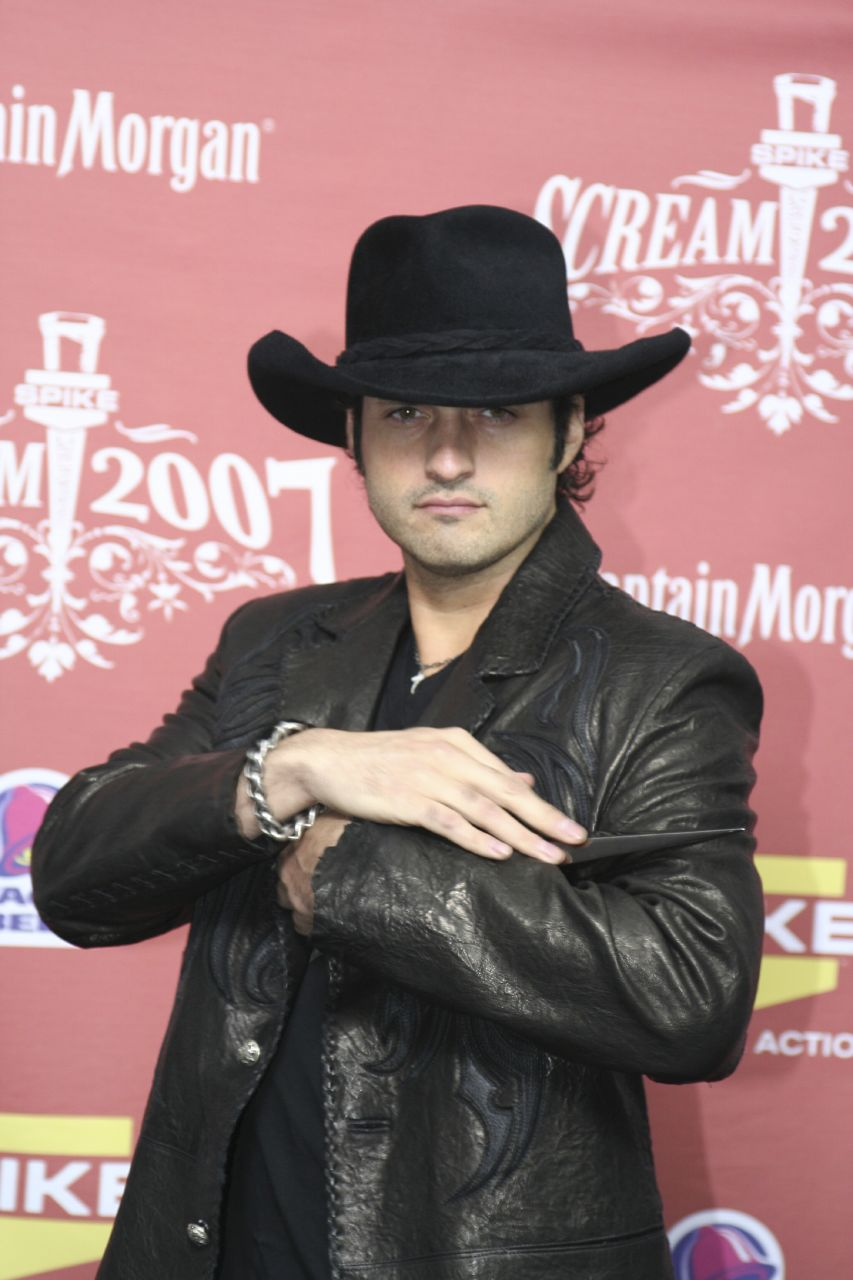
Robert Rodriguez at Scream 2007.

== Special awards ==
The special achievement awards of the 2007 Scream Awards were as follows:-

Winners and nominees
Award	Recipient
Comic-Con Icon	Neil Gaiman
Hero	Harrison Ford
Scream Rock Immortal	Alice Cooper

== See also ==
- Saturn Award
