= 2009 Scream Awards =

2009 USA film awards

4th Scream Awards
- Announced on: October 27, 2009
- Presented on: October 17, 2009
- Produced by: executive producers: Casey Patterson; Michael Levitt; Cindy Levitt; supervising producers: Greg Stills; producers: Gary Tellalian; Austin Reading
- Directed by: Hamish Hamilton
- Official website: www.scream.spike.com

Highlights
- Most awards: Star Trek
- Most nominations: Star Trek

Television coverage
- Network: Spike TV

Billed as Scream 2009, the 2009 ceremony of the Scream Awards, run by Spike TV, was the fourth annual iteration of these awards. The awards were billed as "commemorating all things sci-fi, fantasy, horror and comic book". The awards ceremony was held on October 17, 2009, at the Greek Theatre in Los Angeles and was broadcast by Spike TV on the following Tuesday (October 27, 2009).

The shows original creators, Casey Patterson, Michael Levitt, and Cindy Levitt, served as executive producers for the event.

== Performances ==
This was the first year that the show did not have any musical performances.

== World Premieres ==
Movie Premiers
Content Premiered	Presenters
Alice in Wonderland	Jessica Alba
Shutter Island	Jackie Earle Haley
V	Elizabeth Mitchell
Star Trek DVD extras	John Cho and Karl Urban
The Twilight Saga: New Moon behind-the-scenes / visual effects footage	Taylor Lautner

== Competitive categories ==
The Scream 2009 nominees were selected by the Advisory Board of Hollywood and Genre Leaders. The advisory board included Wes Craven, Roland Emmerich, Neil Gaiman, Frank Miller, Eli Roth, and Zack Snyder etc. The winners were chosen by a process of public online voting on the Spike TV website, which ran up until the day of the ceremony (Saturday, October 17, 2009) where they were announced. The nominees and winners of the 2009 Scream Awards were as follows:

Winners and nominees
Award	Recipient	Result
Ultimate Scream	Drag Me to Hell	Nominated
Ultimate Scream	Let the Right One In	Nominated
Ultimate Scream	Star Trek	Won
Ultimate Scream	Transformers: Revenge of the Fallen	Nominated
Ultimate Scream	Twilight	Nominated
Ultimate Scream	Up	Nominated
Best Horror Movie	Dead Snow	Nominated
Best Horror Movie	Drag Me to Hell	Won
Best Horror Movie	Friday the 13th	Nominated
Best Horror Movie	Let the Right One In	Nominated
Best Horror Movie	My Bloody Valentine 3D	Nominated
Best Horror Movie	Splinter	Nominated
Best Science Fiction Movie	Knowing	Nominated
Best Science Fiction Movie	Moon	Nominated
Best Science Fiction Movie	Outlander	Nominated
Best Science Fiction Movie	Star Trek	Won
Best Science Fiction Movie	Terminator Salvation	Nominated
Best Science Fiction Movie	Transformers: Revenge of the Fallen	Nominated
Best Fantasy Movie	Coraline	Nominated
Best Fantasy Movie	Harry Potter and the Half-Blood Prince	Nominated
Best Fantasy Movie	Twilight	Won
Best Fantasy Movie	Up	Nominated
Best Fantasy Movie	Watchmen	Nominated
Best Fantasy Movie	X-Men Origins: Wolverine	Nominated
Best TV Show	Battlestar Galactica	Nominated
Best TV Show	Dexter	Nominated
Best TV Show	Fringe	Nominated
Best TV Show	Lost	Nominated
Best TV Show	Terminator: The Sarah Connor Chronicles	Nominated
Best TV Show	True Blood	Won
Best Horror Actress	Jennifer Carpenter as Angela Vidal, Quarantine	Nominated
Best Horror Actress	Jaime King as Sarah Mercer-Palmer, My Bloody Valentine 3D	Nominated
Best Horror Actress	Lina Leandersson as Eli, Let the Right One In	Nominated
Best Horror Actress	Alison Lohman as Christine Brown, Drag Me to Hell	Won
Best Horror Actress	Monica Potter as Emma Collingwood, The Last House on the Left	Nominated
Best Horror Actor	Bruce Campbell, My Name Is Bruce	Nominated
Best Horror Actor	Michael C. Hall, Dexter	Nominated
Best Horror Actor	Kåre Hedebrant, Let the Right One In	Nominated
Best Horror Actor	Justin Long, Drag Me to Hell	Nominated
Best Horror Actor	Ryan Kwanten, True Blood	Nominated
Best Horror Actor	Stephen Moyer, True Blood	Won
Best Fantasy Actress	Anna Friel, Pushing Daisies	Nominated
Best Fantasy Actress	Scarlett Johansson, The Spirit	Nominated
Best Fantasy Actress	Jaime King, The Spirit	Nominated
Best Fantasy Actress	Rhona Mitra, Underworld: Rise of the Lycans	Nominated
Best Fantasy Actress	Kristen Stewart, Twilight	Won
Best Fantasy Actress	Emma Watson, Harry Potter and the Half-Blood Prince	Nominated
Best Fantasy Actor	Ed Asner, Up	Nominated
Best Fantasy Actor	Hugh Jackman, X-Men Origins: Wolverine	Nominated
Best Fantasy Actor	Robert Pattinson, Twilight	Won
Best Fantasy Actor	Brad Pitt, The Curious Case of Benjamin Button	Nominated
Best Fantasy Actor	Daniel Radcliffe, Harry Potter and the Half-Blood Prince	Nominated
Best Fantasy Actor	Michael Sheen, Underworld: Rise of the Lycans	Nominated
Best Science Fiction Actress	Moon Bloodgood, Terminator Salvation	Nominated
Best Science Fiction Actress	Eliza Dushku, Dollhouse	Nominated
Best Science Fiction Actress	Megan Fox, Transformers: Revenge of the Fallen	Won
Best Science Fiction Actress	Lena Headey, Terminator: The Sarah Connor Chronicles	Nominated
Best Science Fiction Actress	Katee Sackhoff, Battlestar Galactica	Nominated
Best Science Fiction Actress	Zoe Saldaña, Star Trek	Nominated
Best Science Fiction Actor	Nicolas Cage, Knowing	Nominated
Best Science Fiction Actor	Josh Holloway, Lost	Nominated
Best Science Fiction Actor	Shia LaBeouf, Transformers: Revenge of the Fallen	Nominated
Best Science Fiction Actor	Chris Pine, Star Trek	Won
Best Science Fiction Actor	Zachary Quinto, Star Trek	Nominated
Best Science Fiction Actor	Sam Rockwell, Moon	Nominated
Best Supporting Actress	Jennifer Carpenter, Dexter	Won
Best Supporting Actress	Ashley Greene, Twilight	Nominated
Best Supporting Actress	Carla Gugino, Watchmen	Nominated
Best Supporting Actress	Evanna Lynch, Harry Potter and the Half-Blood Prince	Nominated
Best Supporting Actress	Shirley Manson, Terminator: The Sarah Connor Chronicles	Nominated
Best Supporting Actress	Rutina Wesley, True Blood	Nominated
Best Supporting Actor	Ryan Reynolds, X-Men Origins: Wolverine	Won
Best Supporting Actor	Simon Pegg, Star Trek	Nominated
Best Supporting Actor	Leonard Nimoy, Star Trek	Nominated
Best Supporting Actor	Taylor Kitsch, X-Men Origins: Wolverine	Nominated
Best Supporting Actor	Rupert Grint, Harry Potter and the Half-Blood Prince	Nominated
Best Supporting Actor	Nelsan Ellis, True Blood	Nominated
Breakout Performance - Female	Anna Torv, Fringe	Nominated
Breakout Performance - Female	Zoe Saldaña, Star Trek	Nominated
Breakout Performance - Female	Lorna Raver, Drag Me to Hell	Nominated
Breakout Performance - Female	Isabel Lucas, Transformers: Revenge of the Fallen	Won
Breakout Performance - Female	Lina Leandersson, Let the Right One In	Nominated
Breakout Performance - Female	Malin Åkerman, Watchmen	Nominated
Breakout Performance - Male	Taylor Kitsch, X-Men Origins: Wolverine	Nominated
Breakout Performance - Male	Taylor Lautner, Twilight	Won
Breakout Performance - Male	Robert Pattinson, Twilight	Nominated
Breakout Performance - Male	Chris Pine, Star Trek	Nominated
Breakout Performance - Male	will.i.am, X-Men Origins: Wolverine	Nominated
Breakout Performance - Male	Sam Worthington, Terminator Salvation	Nominated
Best Cameo	Kate Beckinsale, Underworld: Rise of the Lycans	Nominated
Best Cameo	Helena Bonham Carter, Terminator Salvation	Nominated
Best Cameo	Winona Ryder, Star Trek	Won
Best Cameo	Arnold Schwarzenegger, Terminator Salvation	Nominated
Best Cameo	Patrick Stewart, X-Men Origins: Wolverine	Nominated
Best Cameo	Rainn Wilson, Transformers: Revenge of the Fallen	Nominated
Best Ensemble	Harry Potter and the Half-Blood Prince	Won
Best Ensemble	Battlestar Galactica	Nominated
Best Ensemble	Lost	Nominated
Best Ensemble	Star Trek	Nominated
Best Ensemble	True Blood	Nominated
Best Ensemble	Twilight	Nominated
Best Ensemble	Watchmen	Nominated
Best Director	J. J. Abrams, Star Trek	Won
Best Director	Tomas Alfredson, Let the Right One In	Nominated
Best Director	Michael Bay, Transformers: Revenge of the Fallen	Nominated
Best Director	Pete Docter and Bob Peterson, Up	Nominated
Best Director	Duncan Jones, Moon	Nominated
Best Director	Sam Raimi, Drag Me to Hell	Nominated
Best Foreign Movie	Dead Snow	Nominated
Best Foreign Movie	Eden Lake	Nominated
Best Foreign Movie	Let the Right One In	Won
Best Foreign Movie	Martyrs	Nominated
Best Foreign Movie	Pontypool	Nominated
Best Foreign Movie	Los Cronocrímenes	Nominated
Best Sequel	Harry Potter and the Half-Blood Prince	Nominated
Best Sequel	Punisher: War Zone	Nominated
Best Sequel	Terminator Salvation	Nominated
Best Sequel	Transformers: Revenge of the Fallen	Won
Best Sequel	Underworld: Rise of the Lycans	Nominated
Best Sequel	X-Men Origins: Wolverine	Nominated
Best F/X	Drag Me to Hell	Nominated
Best F/X	Harry Potter and the Half-Blood Prince	Nominated
Best F/X	Star Trek	Nominated
Best F/X	Terminator Salvation	Nominated
Best F/X	Transformers: Revenge of the Fallen	Won
Best F/X	Watchmen	Nominated
Scream Song of the Year	"War Zone" by Rob Zombie, Punisher: War Zone	Nominated
Scream Song of the Year	New Divide by Linkin Park, Transformers: Revenge of the Fallen	Won
Scream Song of the Year	"Other Father Song" by They Might Be Giants, Coraline	Nominated
Scream Song of the Year	"Desolation Row" by My Chemical Romance, Watchmen	Nominated
Scream Song of the Year	"Decode" by Paramore, Twilight	Nominated
Scream Song of the Year	"Bad Things" by Jace Everett, True Blood	Nominated
Best Comic Book Artist	Tony Harris and Jim Clark, "Ex Machina"	Nominated
Best Comic Book Artist	Steve McNiven, Wolverine: Old Man Logan	Won
Best Comic Book Artist	Eric Powell, "The Goon"	Nominated
Best Comic Book Artist	Frank Quitely, "All-Star Superman" and "Batman and Robin"	Nominated
Best Comic Book Artist	Ivan Reis, "Green Lantern"	Nominated
Best Comic Book Artist	John Romita Jr., "The Amazing Spider-Man Volume 1"	Nominated
Best Villain	Eric Bana, Star Trek	Nominated
Best Villain	Helena Bonham Carter, Harry Potter and the Half-Blood Prince	Nominated
Best Villain	Cam Gigandet, Twilight	Nominated
Best Villain	Lorna Raver, Drag Me to Hell	Nominated
Best Villain	Liev Schreiber, X-Men Origins: Wolverine	Nominated
Best Villain	Alexander Skarsgård, True Blood	Won
Best Superhero	Ray Stevenson as The Punisher, Punisher: War Zone	Nominated
Best Superhero	Taylor Kitsch as Gambit, X-Men Origins: Wolverine	Nominated
Best Superhero	Hugh Jackman as Wolverine, X-Men Origins: Wolverine	Won
Best Superhero	Jackie Earle Haley as Rorschach, Watchmen	Nominated
Best Superhero	Billy Crudup as Doctor Manhattan, Watchmen	Nominated
Best Superhero	Malin Åkerman as Silk Spectre, Watchmen	Nominated
Best Scream-Play	Coraline	Nominated
Best Scream-Play	Drag Me to Hell	Won
Best Scream-Play	Let the Right One In	Nominated
Best Scream-Play	Moon	Nominated
Best Scream-Play	Star Trek	Nominated
Best Scream-Play	Up	Nominated
Most Memorable Mutilation	Arms Cut off by Rotary Saw, Watchmen	Nominated
Most Memorable Mutilation	Arm Removal Surgery, Splinter	Nominated
Most Memorable Mutilation	The Eyeball Cake, Drag Me to Hell	Nominated
Most Memorable Mutilation	Head Ripped Apart by Nazi Zombies, Dead Snow	Nominated
Most Memorable Mutilation	The Pendulum Trap, Saw V	Won
Most Memorable Mutilation	The Swimming Pool Scene, Let the Right One In	Nominated
Fight Scene of the Year	The Car Fight, Drag Me to Hell	Nominated
Fight Scene of the Year	Martin and Roy v. The Nazi Zombies, Dead Snow	Nominated
Fight Scene of the Year	Logan and Victor v. Weapon XI, X-Men Origins: Wolverine	Nominated
Fight Scene of the Year	Optimus Prime v. The Fallen, Transformers: Revenge of the Fallen	Nominated
Fight Scene of the Year	Kirk v. Spock, Star Trek	Won
Fight Scene of the Year	Ozymandias v. The Comedian, Watchmen	Nominated
Holy Sh!t! Scene of the Year	The Swimming Pool Scene, Let the Right One In	Nominated
Holy Sh!t! Scene of the Year	The Subway Crash, Knowing	Nominated
Holy Sh!t! Scene of the Year	The Séance, Drag Me to Hell	Nominated
Holy Sh!t! Scene of the Year	Space Dive into Orbital Drill, Star Trek	Nominated
Holy Sh!t! Scene of the Year	The Destruction of Manhattan, Watchmen	Nominated
Holy Sh!t! Scene of the Year	The Death Eaters Attack London, Harry Potter and the Half-Blood Prince	Won
Best Comic Book	Green Lantern	Won
Best Comic Book	Hack/Slash	Nominated
Best Comic Book	Kick-Ass	Nominated
Best Comic Book	Thor	Nominated
Best Comic Book	The Walking Dead	Nominated
Best Comic Book	Wolverine: Old Man Logan	Nominated
Best Comic Book Writer	Brian Michael Bendis	Nominated
Best Comic Book Writer	Joe Hill	Nominated
Best Comic Book Writer	Grant Morrison	Nominated
Best Comic Book Writer	Geoff Johns	Won
Best Comic Book Writer	Mark Millar	Nominated
Best Comic Book Writer	Brian K. Vaughan	Nominated
Best Comic Book Movie	Dragonball Evolution	Nominated
Best Comic Book Movie	Punisher: War Zone	Nominated
Best Comic Book Movie	The Spirit	Nominated
Best Comic Book Movie	Watchmen	Won
Best Comic Book Movie	X-Men Origins: Wolverine	Nominated
Breakout Movie of the Year	Zombieland	Won
Most Anticipated Fantasy Film	Alice in Wonderland	Won
Most Anticipated Science Fiction Film	Iron Man 2	Won

Notable appearances included William Shatner accepting the Ultimate Scream award for J. J. Abrams' reboot of the Star Trek franchise.

== Special awards ==
The special achievement award recipients of the 2009 Scream Awards were as follows:-

Winners and nominees
Award	Recipient
Comic-Con Icon (presented by Tobey Maguire)	Stan Lee
Scream Rock Immortal (presented by Johnny Depp)	Keith Richards
Scream Mastermind (presented by Quentin Tarantino)	George A. Romero

== Farewell Tribute ==
A farewell tribute was given for the conclusion of Battlestar Galactica, which a number of the show's cast attended including The Big Bang Theory cast members Johnny Galecki, Jim Parsons, Kaley Cuoco, Simon Helberg and Kunal Nayyar.

== See also ==
- Saturn Award
