= 2006 Scream Awards =

2006 USA film awards

1st Scream Awards
- Announced on: October 10, 2006
- Presented on: October 7, 2006
- Produced by: Executive producers: Casey Patterson; Michael Levitt; Cindy Levitt; Supervising producers: Greg Sills; Producers: Gary Tellalian

Highlights
- Most awards: Pirates of the Caribbean: Dead Man's Chest
- Most nominations: Batman Begins

Television coverage
- Network: Spike TV

Billed as Spike TV's Scream Awards 2006, the 2006 ceremony of the Scream Awards, run by Spike TV, was the premier iteration of these awards, which was run annually in subsequent years. The awards ceremony was held on October 7, 2006 at the Historic Pantages Theater in Hollywood, Los Angeles, California) and was broadcast by Spike TV on the following Tuesday (October 10, 2006).

The shows original creators, Casey Patterson, Michael Levitt, and Cindy Levitt, served as executive producers for the event.

== Hosts ==
The ceremony was hosted by Grindhouse co-stars Rose McGowan, Marley Shelton, and Rosario Dawson.

== World premieres ==
Movie Premiers
| Content Premiered | Presenters |
|---|---|
| Superman II: The Richard Donner Cut | Rosario Dawson, Rose McGowan and Marley Shelton |
| Grindhouse | Robert Rodriguez and Quentin Tarantino |
| Saw III | Tobin Bell, Shawnee Smith, and Darren Lynn Bousman |

== Performances ==
Movie Premiers
| Artist | Performance |
|---|---|
| My Chemical Romance | "Welcome to the Black Parade" |
| KoЯn | "Coming Undone" |

== Competitive categories ==
The nominees were chosen by the advisory board of Hollywood and Genre Leaders, a body made up of respected and well-known members of the horror, sci-fi, fantasy and comic book worlds, who also advised on the award categories. The advisory board included Wes Craven, David S. Goyer, Geoff Johns, R. Eric Lieb, Brian Pulido, Judd Winick, Jonathan Woods, and Rob Zombie.

The winners were chosen by a process of public online voting on the Spike TV website, which ran July 21, 2006 until October 6, 2006, the day before the ceremony.

The nominees and winners were as follows:

Winners and nominees
| Award | Recipient | Result |
|---|---|---|
| Ultimate Scream | Batman Begins | Won |
| Ultimate Scream | The Devil's Rejects | Nominated |
| Ultimate Scream | The Hills Have Eyes | Nominated |
| Ultimate Scream | Lost | Nominated |
| Ultimate Scream | Superman Returns | Nominated |
| Best Horror Movie | The Devil's Rejects | Won |
| Best Horror Movie | Land of the Dead | Nominated |
| Best Horror Movie | High Tension | Nominated |
| Best Horror Movie | The Hills Have Eyes | Nominated |
| Best Horror Movie | Hostel | Nominated |
| Best Fantasy Movie | Batman Begins | Nominated |
| Best Fantasy Movie | Harry Potter and the Goblet of Fire | Nominated |
| Best Fantasy Movie | King Kong | Nominated |
| Best Fantasy Movie | Pirates of the Caribbean: Dead Man's Chest | Won |
| Best Fantasy Movie | Superman Returns | Nominated |
| Best Fantasy Movie | Corpse Bride | Nominated |
| Best Science Fiction Movie | Aeon Flux | Nominated |
| Best Science Fiction Movie | A Scanner Darkly | Nominated |
| Best Science Fiction Movie | Serenity | Nominated |
| Best Science Fiction Movie | V for Vendetta | Won |
| Best Science Fiction Movie | War of the Worlds | Nominated |
| Best TV Show | Battlestar Galactica | Won |
| Best TV Show | Doctor Who | Nominated |
| Best TV Show | Heroes | Nominated |
| Best TV Show | Lost | Nominated |
| Best TV Show | Masters of Horror | Nominated |
| Best TV Show | Smallville | Nominated |
| Best Sequel | Batman Begins | Nominated |
| Best Sequel | George A. Romero's Land of the Dead | Nominated |
| Best Sequel | Pirates of the Caribbean: Dead Man's Chest | Won |
| Best Sequel | Saw II | Nominated |
| Best Sequel | Superman Returns | Nominated |
| Best Remake | Charlie and the Chocolate Factory | Nominated |
| Best Remake | The Hills Have Eyes | Nominated |
| Best Remake | King Kong | Won |
| Best Remake | The Omen | Nominated |
| Best Remake | War of the Worlds | Nominated |
| Best Superhero | Christian Bale as Batman, Batman Begins | Nominated |
| Best Superhero | Chris Evans as the Human Torch, Fantastic Four | Nominated |
| Best Superhero | Hugh Jackman as Wolverine, X-Men: The Last Stand | Nominated |
| Best Superhero | Famke Janssen as Phoenix, X-Men: The Last Stand | Nominated |
| Best Superhero | Brandon Routh as Superman, Superman Returns | Won |
| Sexiest Superhero | Jessica Alba as The Invisible Woman, Fantastic Four | Won |
| Sexiest Superhero | Famke Janssen as Phoenix, X-Men: The Last Stand | Nominated |
| Sexiest Superhero | Halle Berry as Storm, X-Men: The Last Stand | Nominated |
| Sexiest Superhero | Uma Thurman as G Girl, My Super Ex-Girlfriend | Nominated |
| Best Comic-to-Screen Adaptation | Batman Begins | Nominated |
| Best Comic-to-Screen Adaptation | A History of Violence | Nominated |
| Best Comic-to-Screen Adaptation | Superman Returns | Nominated |
| Best Comic-to-Screen Adaptation | V for Vendetta | Nominated |
| Best Comic-to-Screen Adaptation | X-Men: The Last Stand | Won |
| Most Memorable Mutilation | Eaten alive, George A. Romero's Land of the Dead | Nominated |
| Most Memorable Mutilation | The eye removal, Hostel | Won |
| Most Memorable Mutilation | Stabbed in a pit of syringes, Saw II | Nominated |
| Most Memorable Mutilation | Suicide by shotgun, The Hills Have Eyes | Nominated |
| Most Memorable Mutilation | Vaporized by aliens, War of the Worlds | Nominated |
| Most Heroic Performance | Christian Bale as Batman, Batman Begins | Nominated |
| Most Heroic Performance | Johnny Depp as Captain Jack Sparrow, Pirates of the Caribbean: Dead Man's Chest | Won |
| Most Heroic Performance | Viggo Mortensen as Tom Stall, A History of Violence | Nominated |
| Most Heroic Performance | Edward James Olmos as Commander William Adama, Battlestar Galactica | Nominated |
| Most Heroic Performance | Hugo Weaving as V, V for Vendetta | Nominated |
| Scream Queen | Asia Argento as Slack, Land of the Dead | Nominated |
| Scream Queen | Kate Beckinsale as Selene, Underworld: Evolution | Won |
| Scream Queen | Evangeline Lilly, as Kate Austen, Lost | Nominated |
| Scream Queen | Natalie Portman as Evey Hammond, V for Vendetta | Nominated |
| Scream Queen | Naomi Watts as Ann Darrow, King Kong | Nominated |
| Most Vile Villain | Tobin Bell as Jigsaw, Saw II | Nominated |
| Most Vile Villain | Leslie Easterbrook (Mother Firefly), Sid Haig (Captain Spaulding), Bill Moseley (Otis B. Driftwood), and Sheri Moon Zombie (Baby) as the Firefly Clan, The Devil's Rejects | Won |
| Most Vile Villain | Sir Ian McKellen as Magneto, X-Men: The Last Stand | Nominated |
| Most Vile Villain | Cillian Murphy as Scarecrow, Batman Begins | Nominated |
| Most Vile Villain | Philippe Nahon as The Killer, High Tension | Nominated |
| Breakout Performance | Adewale Akinnuoye-Agbaje as Mr. Eko, Lost | Nominated |
| Breakout Performance | Jennifer Carpenter as Emily Rose, The Exorcism of Emily Rose | Won |
| Breakout Performance | Tricia Helfer as Number Six, Battlestar Galactica | Nominated |
| Breakout Performance | Brandon Routh as Superman, Superman Returns | Nominated |
| Breakout Performance | Katee Sackhoff as Starbuck, Battlestar Galactica | Nominated |
| Best Ensemble | Pirates of the Caribbean: Dead Man's Chest | Won |
| Fantasy Fox | Evangeline Lilly as Kate Austen, Lost | Won |
| "Holy Sh%t" | Alien pods emerge from the Earth, War of the Worlds | Nominated |
| "Holy Sh%t" | The diner shootout, A History of Violence | Nominated |
| "Holy Sh%t" | The eye removal, Hostel | Won |
| "Holy Sh%t" | The Space Shuttle/Boeing 777 rescue, Superman Returns | Nominated |
| "Holy Sh%t" | The train sequence, Batman Begins | Nominated |
| Best Director | Alexandre Aja, The Hills Have Eyes | Won |
| Best Director | David Cronenberg, A History of Violence | Nominated |
| Best Director | Christopher Nolan, Batman Begins | Nominated |
| Best Director | Bryan Singer, Superman Returns | Nominated |
| Best Director | Rob Zombie, The Devil's Rejects | Nominated |
| Best Screamplay | Batman Begins, written by David S. Goyer and Christopher Nolan | Won |
| Best Screamplay | The Devil's Rejects, written by Rob Zombie | Nominated |
| Best Screamplay | Hostel, written by Eli Roth | Nominated |
| Best Screamplay | Pirates of the Caribbean: Dead Man's Chest, written by Ted Elliott and Terry Rossio | Nominated |
| Best Screamplay | V for Vendetta, the Wachowskis | Nominated |
| Best Rack on the Rack | Emma Frost | Nominated |
| Best Rack on the Rack | Lady Death | Nominated |
| Best Rack on the Rack | Power Girl | Nominated |
| Best Rack on the Rack | Vampirella | Won |
| Best Rack on the Rack | Wonder Woman | Nominated |
| Best Foreign Movie | 2046 | Nominated |
| Best Foreign Movie | High Tension | Won |
| Best Foreign Movie | Night Watch | Nominated |
| Best Foreign Movie | Sympathy for Lady Vengeance | Nominated |
| Best Foreign Movie | Sympathy for Mr. Vengeance | Nominated |
| Best Foreign Movie | Three... Extremes | Nominated |
| Best Flesh Scene | Jessica Alba, Fantastic Four | Nominated |
| Best Flesh Scene | Maria Bello & Viggo Mortensen, A History of Violence | Nominated |
| Best Flesh Scene | Famke Janssen & Hugh Jackman, X-Men: The Last Stand | Won |
| Best Flesh Scene | Milla Jovovich, Ultraviolet | Nominated |
| Best Flesh Scene | Jay Hernandez, Jana Kaderabkova, Barbara Nedeljakova, and Derek Richardson, Hostel | Nominated |
| Best Flesh Scene | Rebecca Romijn, X-Men: The Last Stand | Nominated |
| Best Comic Book | All-Star Superman (DC Comics) | Nominated |
| Best Comic Book | Civil War (Marvel Comics) | Nominated |
| Best Comic Book | Ex Machina (Wildstorm Productions) | Nominated |
| Best Comic Book | Marvel Zombies (Marvel Comics) | Won |
| Best Comic Book | The Walking Dead (Image Comics) | Nominated |
| Best Screen-To-Comic Adaptation | Army of Darkness | Won |
| Best Screen-To-Comic Adaptation | The Fountain | Nominated |
| Best Screen-To-Comic Adaptation | Masters of Horror | Nominated |
| Best Screen-To-Comic Adaptation | Saw | Nominated |
| Best Screen-To-Comic Adaptation | Shaun of the Dead | Nominated |
| Best Screen-To-Comic Adaptation | Texas Chainsaw Massacre | Nominated |
| Best Comic Book Writer | Robert Kirkman, The Walking Dead / Marvel Zombies | Nominated |
| Best Comic Book Writer | Mark Millar, Civil War / The Ultimates | Nominated |
| Best Comic Book Writer | Frank Miller, Batman & Robin | Won |
| Best Comic Book Writer | Paul Pope, Batman: Year 100 | Nominated |
| Best Comic Book Writer | Brian K. Vaughan, Ex Machina / Runaways / Y: The Last Man | Nominated |
| Best Comic Book Artist | Charlie Adlard, The Walking Dead | Nominated |
| Best Comic Book Artist | Doug Braithwaite and Alex Ross, Justice | Nominated |
| Best Comic Book Artist | Sean Phillips, Marvel Zombies | Won |
| Best Comic Book Artist | Paul Pope, Batman: Year 100 | Nominated |
| Best Comic Book Artist | Frank Quitely, All-Star Superman | Nominated |
| Best F/X | King Kong | Nominated |
| Best F/X | Pirates of the Caribbean: Dead Man's Chest | Won |
| Best F/X | Superman Returns | Nominated |
| Best F/X | War of the Worlds | Nominated |
| Best F/X | X-Men: The Last Stand | Nominated |
| Best Internet Parody | How Superman Should Have Ended, www.howitshouldhaveended.com | Won |
| Most Shocking Comic Book Twist | Batwoman is a lesbian | Nominated |
| Most Shocking Comic Book Twist | Jason Todd returns as the Red Hood (Batman #635) | Nominated |
| Most Shocking Comic Book Twist | Galactus is eaten by zombies (Marvel Zombies #5) | Nominated |
| Most Shocking Comic Book Twist | Nitro blows up a schoolyard full of kids (Civil War #1) | Nominated |
| Most Shocking Comic Book Twist | Peter Parker outs himself as Spider-Man (Civil War #2) | Won |
| Most Anticipated Movie † | Pirates of the Caribbean: At World's End | Won |

† - "Online Write-In" award.

== Special awards ==
The special achievement awards of the 2006 Scream Awards were as follows:-

Winners and nominees
| Award | Recipient |
|---|---|
| Comic-Con Icon | Frank Miller |
| Scream Mastermind | Quentin Tarantino and Robert Rodriguez, Grindhouse |
| Scream Rock Immortal (presented by Marilyn Manson) | Ozzy Osbourne |
| Ruthless Filmmaker | Darren Lynn Bousman, Mark Burg, Oren Koules, James Wan, and Leigh Whannell, Saw franchise |

== See also ==
- Saturn Award
