= 2008 Scream Awards =

2008 USA film awards

3rd Scream Awards
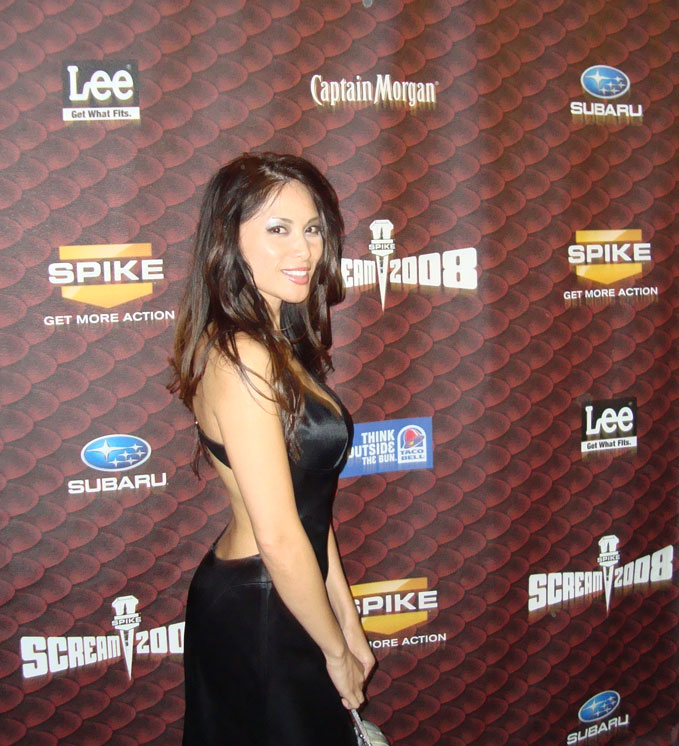
- Josie Lee, Los Angeles Model, at the 2008 Scream Awards.
- Announced on: October 21, 2008
- Presented on: October 18, 2008
- Site: www.spike.com

Highlights
- Most awards: The Dark Knight
- Most nominations: The Dark Knight

Television coverage
- Network: Spike TV
- Duration: 2 hours

Billed as Scream 2008, the 2008 ceremony of the Scream Awards, run by Spike TV, was the third annual iteration of the awards. The awards ceremony was held on Saturday, October 18, 2008 at The Greek Theatre in Los Angeles and was aired on the following Tuesday (October 21, 2008).

== World Premieres ==
The following pieces of footage from several upcoming movie projects was shown:

Movie Premiers
Content Premiered	Presenters
Twilight	Cam Gigandet
Friday the 13th	Jared Padalecki, Amanda Righetti, and Derek Mears
Watchmen	Zack Snyder, Malin Åkerman, Carla Gugino, and Jeffrey Dean Morgan

== Performances ==
Movie Premiers
Artist	Performance
Kerli	"Walking on Air"
The Smashing Pumpkins	"G.L.O.W."

== Competitive categories ==
The Scream 2008 nominees for each category were decided by the advisory board of Hollywood and Genre Leaders, a body which included Wes Craven, Neil Gaiman, Stephen King, Frank Miller, Eli Roth, Guillermo del Toro, Tim Kring, and Stephenie Meyer. The winners were chosen by a process of public online voting on the Spike TV website, and announced during the awards airing on Spike TV.

The Dark Knight was noted receiving a record 21 nominations, of which it won 12 awards. The total list of nominees and winners of the 2008 Scream Awards were as follows:

Winners and nominees
Award	Recipient	Result
Ultimate Scream	Cloverfield	Nominated
Ultimate Scream	The Dark Knight	Won
Ultimate Scream	Hellboy II: The Golden Army	Nominated
Ultimate Scream	Iron Man	Nominated
Ultimate Scream	Lost	Nominated
Ultimate Scream	The Mist	Nominated
Best Fantasy Movie	Beowulf	Nominated
Best Fantasy Movie	The Dark Knight	Nominated
Best Fantasy Movie	Hancock	Nominated
Best Fantasy Movie	Hellboy II: The Golden Army	Won
Best Fantasy Movie	The Incredible Hulk	Nominated
Best Fantasy Movie	Wanted	Nominated
Best Horror Movie	30 Days of Night	Nominated
Best Horror Movie	The Mist	Nominated
Best Horror Movie	The Orphanage	Nominated
Best Horror Movie	The Ruins	Nominated
Best Horror Movie	The Strangers	Nominated
Best Horror Movie	Sweeney Todd: The Demon Barber of Fleet Street	Won
Best Science Fiction Movie	Cloverfield	Nominated
Best Science Fiction Movie	I Am Legend	Nominated
Best Science Fiction Movie	Indiana Jones and the Kingdom of the Crystal Skull	Nominated
Best Science Fiction Movie	Iron Man	Won
Best Science Fiction Movie	Southland Tales	Nominated
Best Science Fiction Movie	WALL-E	Nominated
Best Fantasy Actor	Christian Bale, The Dark Knight	Nominated
Best Fantasy Actor	Heath Ledger, The Dark Knight	Won
Best Fantasy Actor	James McAvoy, Wanted	Nominated
Best Fantasy Actor	Edward Norton, The Incredible Hulk	Nominated
Best Fantasy Actor	Terry O'Quinn, Lost	Nominated
Best Fantasy Actor	Ron Perlman, Hellboy II: The Golden Army	Nominated
Best Horror Actor	Johnny Depp, Sweeney Todd: The Demon Barber of Fleet Street	Won
Best Horror Actor	Fernando Cayo, The Orphanage	Nominated
Best Horror Actor	Thomas Jane, The Mist	Nominated
Best Horror Actor	Stephen Moyer, True Blood	Nominated
Best Horror Actor	Jared Padalecki, Supernatural	Nominated
Best Horror Actor	Jonathan Tucker, The Ruins	Nominated
Best Superhero	Christian Bale as Batman, The Dark Knight	Won
Best Superhero	Will Smith as John Hancock, Hancock	Nominated
Best Superhero	Masi Oka as Iron Man, Heroes	Nominated
Best Superhero	Robert Downey Jr. as Iron Man, Iron Man	Nominated
Best Superhero	Edward Norton as Hulk, The Incredible Hulk	Nominated
Best Superhero	Ron Perlman as Hellboy, Hellboy II: The Golden Army	Nominated
Breakout Performance	Anna Friel, Pushing Daisies	Nominated
Breakout Performance	Jessica Lucas, Cloverfield	Nominated
Breakout Performance	T.J. Miller, Cloverfield	Nominated
Breakout Performance	WALL-E, WALL-E	Won
Breakout Performance	Anna Walton, Hellboy II: The Golden Army	Nominated
Breakout Performance	Odette Annable, Cloverfield	Nominated
Best Horror Actress	Julie Benz as Rita Bennett, Dexter	Nominated
Best Horror Actress	Jena Malone as Amy, The Ruins	Nominated
Best Horror Actress	Belen Rueda as Laura García Rodríguez, The Orphanage	Nominated
Best Horror Actress	Liv Tyler as Kristen McKay, The Strangers	Won
Best Horror Actress	Naomi Watts as Ann Farber, Funny Games	Nominated
Best Horror Actress	Helena Bonham Carter as Nellie Lovett, Sweeney Todd: The Demon Barber of Fleet Street	Nominated
Best Villain	Tobin Bell as Jigsaw, Saw IV	Nominated
Best Villain	Jeff Bridges as Iron Monger, Iron Man	Nominated
Best Villain	Aaron Eckhart as Two-Face, The Dark Knight	Nominated
Best Villain	Zachary Quinto as Sylar, Heroes	Nominated
Best Villain	Heath Ledger as The Joker, The Dark Knight	Won
Best Villain	Alan Rickman as Judge Turpin, Sweeney Todd: The Demon Barber of Fleet Street	Nominated
Best Fantasy Actress	Amy Adams, Enchanted	Nominated
Best Fantasy Actress	Selma Blair, Hellboy II: The Golden Army	Nominated
Best Fantasy Actress	Maggie Gyllenhaal, The Dark Knight	Nominated
Best Fantasy Actress	Angelina Jolie, Wanted	Won
Best Fantasy Actress	Hayden Panettiere, Heroes	Nominated
Best Fantasy Actress	Charlize Theron, Hancock	Nominated
Best Supporting Performance	Gary Oldman, The Dark Knight	Won
Best Supporting Performance	Jason Bateman, Hancock	Nominated
Best Supporting Performance	Michael Caine, The Dark Knight	Nominated
Best Supporting Performance	Terrence Howard, Iron Man	Nominated
Best Supporting Performance	Doug Jones, Hellboy II: The Golden Army	Nominated
Best Supporting Performance	Shia LaBeouf, Indiana Jones and the Kingdom of the Crystal Skull	Nominated
Holy Sh%t Scene of the Year	The Batmobile/Batpod chase, The Dark Knight	Nominated
Holy Sh%t Scene of the Year	Big Rig Flips Over, The Dark Knight	Won
Holy Sh%t Scene of the Year	Escape from Ten Rings hideout, Iron Man	Nominated
Holy Sh%t Scene of the Year	Iron Man's First Flight, Iron Man	Nominated
Holy Sh%t Scene of the Year	The Reverse Kill Shot, Wanted	Nominated
Holy Sh%t Scene of the Year	The Statue of Liberty Attack, Cloverfield	Nominated
Most Memorable Mutilation	Attacked by the Infected, I Am Legend	Nominated
Most Memorable Mutilation	The Autopsy, Saw IV	Nominated
Most Memorable Mutilation	The Pencil Trick, The Dark Knight	Nominated
Most Memorable Mutilation	Penis Bitten off by Vagina with Teeth, Teeth	Won
Most Memorable Mutilation	The Leg Amputation, The Ruins	Nominated
Most Memorable Mutilation	Attacked by the Flesh Eating Tooth Fairies, Hellboy II: The Golden Army	Nominated
Best TV Show	Battlestar Galactica	Nominated
Best TV Show	Dexter	Won
Best TV Show	Heroes	Nominated
Best TV Show	Lost	Nominated
Best TV Show	Reaper	Nominated
Best TV Show	Terminator: The Sarah Connor Chronicles	Nominated
Best Screamplay	Cloverfield	Nominated
Best Screamplay	The Mist	Nominated
Best Screamplay	The Orphanage	Nominated
Best Screamplay	WALL-E	Nominated
Best Screamplay	The Dark Knight	Won
Best Screamplay	Iron Man	Nominated
Best Scream to Comic Adaptation	Buffy the Vampire Slayer Season Eight	Won
Best Scream to Comic Adaptation	Army of Darkness	Nominated
Best Scream to Comic Adaptation	Battlestar Galactica	Nominated
Best Scream to Comic Adaptation	Freddy vs. Jason vs. Ash	Nominated
Best Scream to Comic Adaptation	A Nightmare on Elm Street	Nominated
Best Scream to Comic Adaptation	The Texas Chainsaw Massacre	Nominated
Best Sequel	The Chronicles of Narnia: Prince Caspian	Nominated
Best Sequel	The Dark Knight	Won
Best Sequel	Hellboy II: The Golden Army	Nominated
Best Sequel	Indiana Jones and the Kingdom of the Crystal Skull	Nominated
Best Sequel	Resident Evil: Extinction	Nominated
Best Sequel	Saw IV	Nominated
Best Director	Tim Burton, Sweeney Todd: The Demon Barber of Fleet Street	Nominated
Best Director	Frank Darabont, The Mist	Nominated
Best Director	Guillermo del Toro, Hellboy II: The Golden Army	Nominated
Best Director	Jon Favreau, Iron Man	Nominated
Best Director	Christopher Nolan, The Dark Knight	Won
Best Director	Rob Zombie, Halloween	Nominated
Best Remake	The Eye	Nominated
Best Remake	Funny Games	Nominated
Best Remake	Halloween	Won
Best Remake	The Incredible Hulk	Nominated
Best Remake	Journey to the Center of Earth	Nominated
Best Remake	Prom Night	Nominated
Best Science Fiction Actor	Robert Downey Jr., Iron Man	Won
Best Science Fiction Actor	Harrison Ford, Indiana Jones and the Kingdom of the Crystal Skull	Nominated
Best Science Fiction Actor	Dwayne Johnson, Southland Tales	Nominated
Best Science Fiction Actor	Edward James Olmos, Battlestar Galactica	Nominated
Best Science Fiction Actor	Will Smith, I Am Legend	Nominated
Best Science Fiction Actor	David Tennant, Doctor Who	Nominated
Best Science Fiction Actress	Summer Glau, Terminator: The Sarah Connor Chronicles	Nominated
Best Science Fiction Actress	Tricia Helfer, Battlestar Galactica	Nominated
Best Science Fiction Actress	Lena Headey, Terminator: The Sarah Connor Chronicles	Nominated
Best Science Fiction Actress	Milla Jovovich, Resident Evil: Extinction	Won
Best Science Fiction Actress	Gwyneth Paltrow, Iron Man	Nominated
Best Science Fiction Actress	Odette Annable, Cloverfield	Nominated
Best F/X	Beowulf	Nominated
Best F/X	Cloverfield	Nominated
Best F/X	The Dark Knight	Won
Best F/X	Hellboy II: The Golden Army	Nominated
Best F/X	Iron Man	Nominated
Best F/X	Wanted	Nominated
Best Comic Book	Astonishing X-Men	Nominated
Best Comic Book	Hack/Slash	Nominated
Best Comic Book	The League of Extraordinary Gentlemen: Black Dossier	Nominated
Best Comic Book	The Umbrella Academy: Apocalypse Suite	Nominated
Best Comic Book	The Walking Dead	Nominated
Best Comic Book	Y: The Last Man	Won
Best Comic Book Movie	30 Days of Night	Nominated
Best Comic Book Movie	The Dark Knight	Won
Best Comic Book Movie	Hellboy II: The Golden Army	Nominated
Best Comic Book Movie	The Incredible Hulk	Nominated
Best Comic Book Movie	Iron Man	Nominated
Best Comic Book Movie	Wanted	Nominated
Best Comic Book Artist	Gabriel Ba, The Umbrella Academy: Apocalypse Suite	Won
Best Comic Book Artist	Darwyn Cooke, The Spirit	Nominated
Best Comic Book Artist	Pia Guerra, Y: The Last Man	Nominated
Best Comic Book Artist	Jim Lee, All Star Batman & Robin, the Boy Wonder	Nominated
Best Comic Book Artist	Joe Quesada, The Amazing Spider-Man	Nominated
Best Comic Book Artist	Alex Ross, Project Superpowers	Nominated
Best Comic Book Writer	Warren Ellis, Anna Mercury / Black Summer / Doktor Sleepless / Fell / No Hero	Nominated
Best Comic Book Writer	Robert Kirkman, Walking Dead	Nominated
Best Comic Book Writer	Mike Mignola, Hellboy: Darkness Calls / Lobster Johnson: The Iron Prometheus	Nominated
Best Comic Book Writer	Alan Moore, The League of Extraordinary Gentlemen: Black Dossier	Nominated
Best Comic Book Writer	Grant Morrison, Batman / Final Crisis	Won
Best Comic Book Writer	Brian K. Vaughan, Ex Machina	Nominated
Most Shocking Comic Book Plot Twist	The 70s heroes return!; Secret Invasion 1	Nominated
Most Shocking Comic Book Plot Twist	Buffy and Satsu in best together!, Buffy The Vampire Slayer: Season Eight	Nominated
Most Shocking Comic Book Plot Twist	The plague is revealed!, Y: The Last Man	Nominated
Most Shocking Comic Book Plot Twist	Kitty Pryde sacrifices herself to save the world!, Giant Sized Astonishing X-Men	Nominated
Most Shocking Comic Book Plot Twist	The slaughter of Woodbury Prison!, Walking Dead	Nominated
Most Shocking Comic Book Plot Twist	The X-Men disband after Professor X is shot in the head by Bishop, X-Men	Won
Best Line	"Hulk Smash", The Incredible Hulk	Nominated
Best Line	"I believe whatever doesn't kill you makes you stranger", The Dark Knight	Won
Best Line	"I am Iron Man", Iron Man	Nominated
Best Line	"I'm not a baby ... I'm a tumor", Hellboy II: The Golden Army	Nominated
Best Line	"I'm gonna make this pencil disappear", The Dark Knight	Nominated
Best Line	"Why so serious?", The Dark Knight	Nominated

== Special awards ==
The special achievement awards of the 2008 Scream Awards were as follows:-

Winners and nominees
Award	Recipient
Comic-Con Icon (presented by Samuel L. Jackson)	George Lucas
Scream Immortal	Tim Burton
Scream Legend (presented by Kate Beckinsale)	Anthony Hopkins
Scream Mastermind	Wes Craven

== See also ==
- Saturn Award
