= Lena Headey =

British actress (born 1973)

- Headey at Rose City Comic Con in 2026
- Born: Lena Kathren Headey; 3 October 1973 (age 53); Hamilton, Bermuda
- Occupation: Actress
- Years active: 1992–present
- Spouses: Peter Loughran (m. 2007; div. 2013); Marc Menchaca (m. 2022)
- Children: 2

Lena Kathren Headey (/ˈliːnə ˈhiːdi/ LEE-nə HEE-dee; born 3 October 1973) is a British actress. She gained international recognition and acclaim for her portrayal of Cersei Lannister on the HBO fantasy drama series Game of Thrones (2011–2019), for which she received five Emmy Award nominations and a Golden Globe Award nomination. She was also nominated for a Saturn Award for her portrayal of Gorgo, Queen of Sparta, in 300 (2006) and a BAFTA Award for directing the short film The Trap (2019).

Headey made her film debut in the mystery drama Waterland (1992), and appeared in the British television play, The Clothes in the Wardrobe (US: The Summer House) (1993). She continued to work steadily in British and American films and on television, before gaining further recognition with her lead performances in the films The Brothers Grimm (2005) and 300 (2006). Her other film credits include The Remains of the Day (1993), The Jungle Book (1994), Mrs Dalloway (1997), Ripley's Game (2002), Imagine Me & You (2005), Dredd (2012), The Purge (2013), 300: Rise of an Empire (2014), Pride and Prejudice and Zombies (2016), and Fighting with My Family (2019).

Headey starred as Sarah Connor in the science-fiction television series Terminator: The Sarah Connor Chronicles (2008–2009) and had recurring roles as Big Mama in the animated series Rise of the Teenage Mutant Ninja Turtles (2018–2020) and as Amelia Hughes in the animated web series Infinity Train (2019–2021). She provided voices for the role-playing video game Risen (2009) and the video game tie-in film Kingsglaive: Final Fantasy XV (2016), as well as the animated series Danger Mouse (2015–2017) and Tales of Arcadia (2017–2018; 2020), and the puppet series The Dark Crystal: Age of Resistance (2019).

== Early life ==
Headey was born the daughter of Susan (née Brown) and John Headey. Her father, a police officer from Yorkshire, was stationed in Hamilton at the time in the Bermuda Police Service. Headey has one younger brother named Tim. When she was five, her family returned to England, initially settling in Somerset. She took ballet lessons as a child. She had her first acting experience when as a pupil at Shelley College; she was noticed at age 17, when performing in a school production at the Royal National Theatre, and was picked for a role in the 1992 film Waterland.

== Career ==
=== Beginnings (1992–2004) ===
At age 17, Headey performed in a one-off show; afterwards a casting agent took her photo and asked her to audition. Casting director Susie Figgis then cast her in a supporting role in the drama Waterland (1992), in which she had the opportunity to work with more experienced actors. This was followed by a major role in The Clothes in the Wardrobe (1993), again with several acclaimed actors, including Julie Walters, Jeanne Moreau, and Joan Plowright. She also had a small role in the 1993 drama film The Remains of the Day, which was critically acclaimed and received eight Academy Awards nominations. She appeared in series three of BBC One drama Spender, starring Jimmy Nail, as a teenage tearaway; and hit ITV show Soldier Soldier with Robson Green and Jerome Flynn. Her career continued to grow in England through the decade, and she got larger parts in bigger motion pictures. In 1996, she was featured as Collette in Kay Mellor's Band of Gold TV series, before starring in Kavanagh QC (1997) as Natasha Jackson.

Headey played Kitty Brydon, the childhood friend and romantic interest of Mowgli, in Disney's The Jungle Book (1994). James Berardinelli praised the cast's "solid performances" as part of a positive critical reception, and the film found moderate commercial success in theaters. She appeared opposite Vanessa Redgrave in the 1997 romantic drama Mrs Dalloway, portraying the closest friend of a housewife, who is now wife of a self-made millionnaire and mother of five. In 1998, she reunited with her Jungle Book co star Sam Neill in the miniseries Merlin as King Arthur’s wife Queen Guinevere. She was then cast in the drama Onegin (1999), a film based on the 19th-century Russian novel Eugene Onegin by Alexander Pushkin, in which she portrayed the fiancée of an aspiring poet and appeared with Ralph Fiennes and Liv Tyler. The film was critically and financially unsuccessful.

In 2000, Headey played a newly promoted lawyer with no apparent emotional attachments in the romantic comedy Aberdeen, receiving the Silver Iris Award for Best Actress at the 2001 Brussels European Film Festival, and also starred as a troubled college student in the psychological drama Gossip, with Kate Hudson. In 2001's comedy The Parole Officer, Headey took on the role of a police officer alongside Steve Coogan in his first film role. While the film was warmly received, ViewLondon remarked: "The only disappointment is Lena Headey, who, despite being fantastically sexy (she's given both a nude scene and a 'dressed as a prostitute' scene), smirks her way through the entire film, even at the most inappropriate moments".

In 2002, she appeared as a mousey Victorian lesbian artist with Gwyneth Paltrow and Aaron Eckhart in the mystery drama Possession, based on the 1990 novel of the same name by British author A. S. Byatt, and as the wife of a law-abiding art framer dying of leukemia in the thriller Ripley's Game, adapted from the 1974 novel of the same name. In its review for the latter, Eye for Film noted: "Whilst this is very much a male-centred film, Lena Headey turns in a powerful performance as Jonathan's wife, creating a sense of balance and normality against which other events are contrasted". Headey portrayed Ava Wigram in The Gathering Storm (2002 film), a BBC–HBO co-produced television biographical film about Winston Churchill in the years just prior to World War II. Headey appeared in the comedy The Actors (2003), opposite Dylan Moran and Michael Caine, portraying the love interest of a struggling actor. She is credited as voice actor for the character Callista in the video game Dishonored.

=== Rise to prominence (2005–2010) ===
Headey found much wider recognition when she starred with Matt Damon and Heath Ledger in Terry Gilliam's adventure fantasy film The Brothers Grimm (2005) as Angelika, whose woodsman father was transformed into a werewolf by the Evil Queen. She was drawn to the character's "tomboy" nature, about which she said: "She lives and grows up and survives in the forest. Terry and I talked about how her instincts are almost animalistic and she can see 360 degrees around her. She is aware of what is going on. That is how she is grounded. She is of the earth". The Brothers Grimm received mixed reviews and made US$105.3 million worldwide.

In 2005, Headey also starred with actress Piper Perabo in the films The Cave and Imagine Me & You. The horror film The Cave had the actress play a member of a group of divers who become trapped in an underwater cave network. While critical response was negative, the film made a profit at the box office. In the romantic dramedy Imagine Me & You, she took on the role of a woman who falls in love at first sight with a newlywed bride who reciprocates her feelings; the newlywed struggles with whether to remain in a passionless marriage to a sweet husband, or pursue her electric connection to Headey's character Luce. The film, which Commonsense Media called "charming", "quirky", and "witty", found a limited release in theaters, but Mick LaSalle from the San Francisco Chronicle stated that the actress "has a forthright, irresistible appeal and a face and especially a smile that suggest intelligence, integrity, and lots of fun".

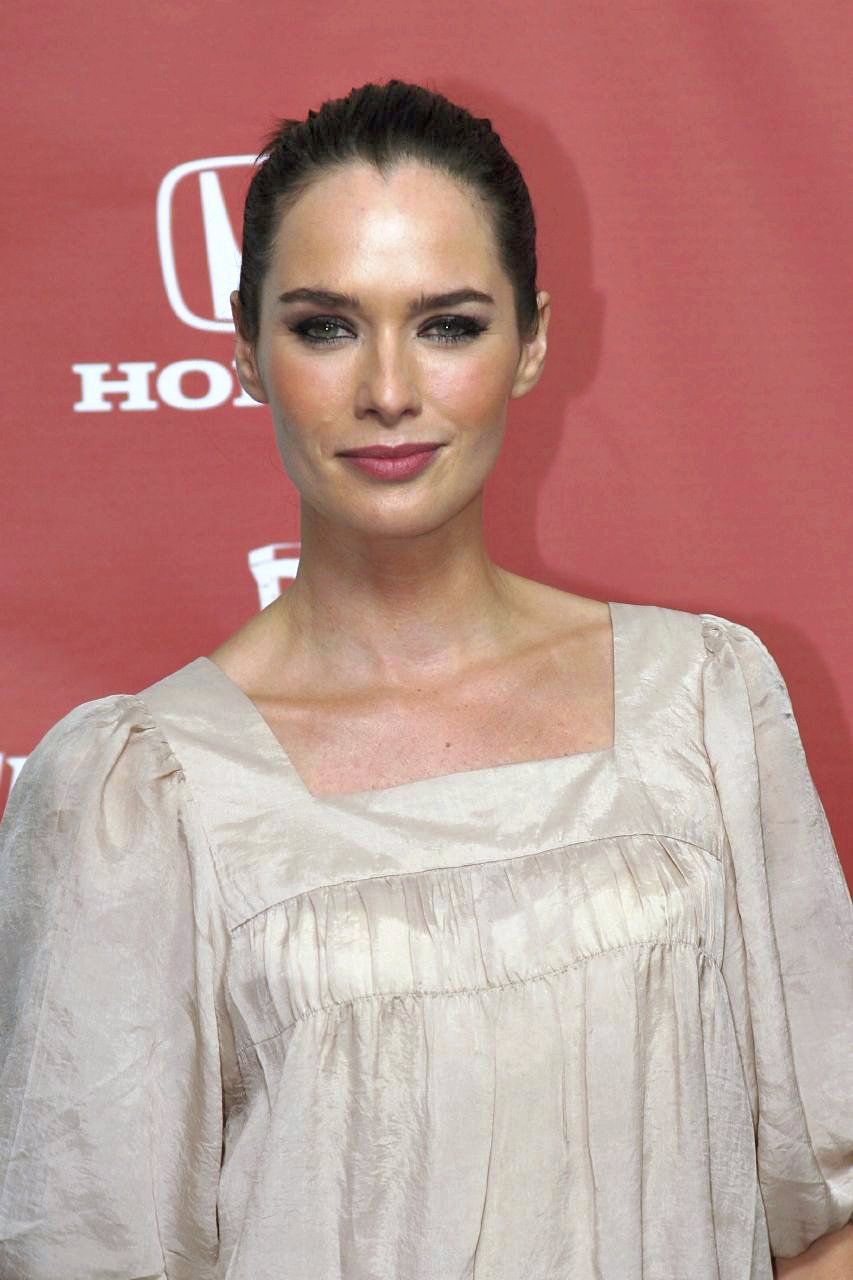
Headey at the 2007 Scream Awards

Perhaps Headey's most known film role came in 2007, when she played Queen Gorgo in Zack Snyder's epic war film 300, based on the 1998 comic series of the same name by Frank Miller and Lynn Varley, a fictionalized retelling of the Battle of Thermopylae within the Persian Wars. Her character has a much larger role in the film than in the comic book, where she appears only in the beginning, and required Headey to film a nude scene. "It's always weird, the thought of taking your clothes off in front of 20 people, and then to have it projected in front of many more", she said in an interview. "I think it was necessary because we only get that scene to establish their relationship. It is a very obvious moment but I think it does it in quite a beautiful way." The film received generally positive reviews and was a box-office success, grossing over US$450 million. In 2007, she also appeared as the stuffy Miss Dickinson in the sixth release of the St. Trinian's film series.

Headey starred as Sarah Connor in Fox's Terminator: The Sarah Connor Chronicles, a television spin-off of James Cameron's popular Terminator franchise. The show ran for 31 episodes in two seasons, from January 2008 to April 2009. Variety praised "Headey's gritty performance as Sarah —managing to be smart, resourceful and tough, yet melancholy and vulnerable as well". For her performance, she was nominated twice for the Saturn Award for Best Actress on Television. In 2008, she starred alongside Matthias Schweighöfer and Joseph Fiennes in The Red Baron, a biographical film of the legendary World War I fighter pilot Manfred von Richthofen, appeared in Ridley Scott-produced sci-fi drama Tell-Tale, a film based on the short story by Edgar Allan Poe, and played a radiologist in the horror film The Broken, which premiered at the Sundance Film Festival. While the three aforementioned films went largely unnoticed by audiences, some critics praised Headey's performance in The Broken, including Kim Koynar, of Cinematical, who wrote that Headey "largely carries the film, and does so quite ably".

In 2009, Headey played an ill-fated character in the slasher film Laid to Rest, which received a DVD release, had a part in a short film titled The Devil's Wedding, and also provided her voice for an episode of the Cartoon Network series The Super Hero Squad Show, playing Black Widow and Mystique. She briefly appeared in the independent comedy Pete Smalls Is Dead (2010).

=== Game of Thrones and major film roles (2011–2014) ===
Beginning in April 2011, Headey portrayed queen regent Cersei Lannister on the HBO series Game of Thrones, based on George R. R. Martin's A Song of Ice and Fire series of novels. She was cast in the role after her friend and eventual co-star, Peter Dinklage, suggested her casting to producers. Her performance as the ruthless queen has received critical acclaim, earning a Scream Award nomination for Best Fantasy Actress for the role in 2011 and Primetime Emmy Award nominations for Outstanding Supporting Actress in a Drama Series in 2014, 2015, 2016, 2018 and 2019.

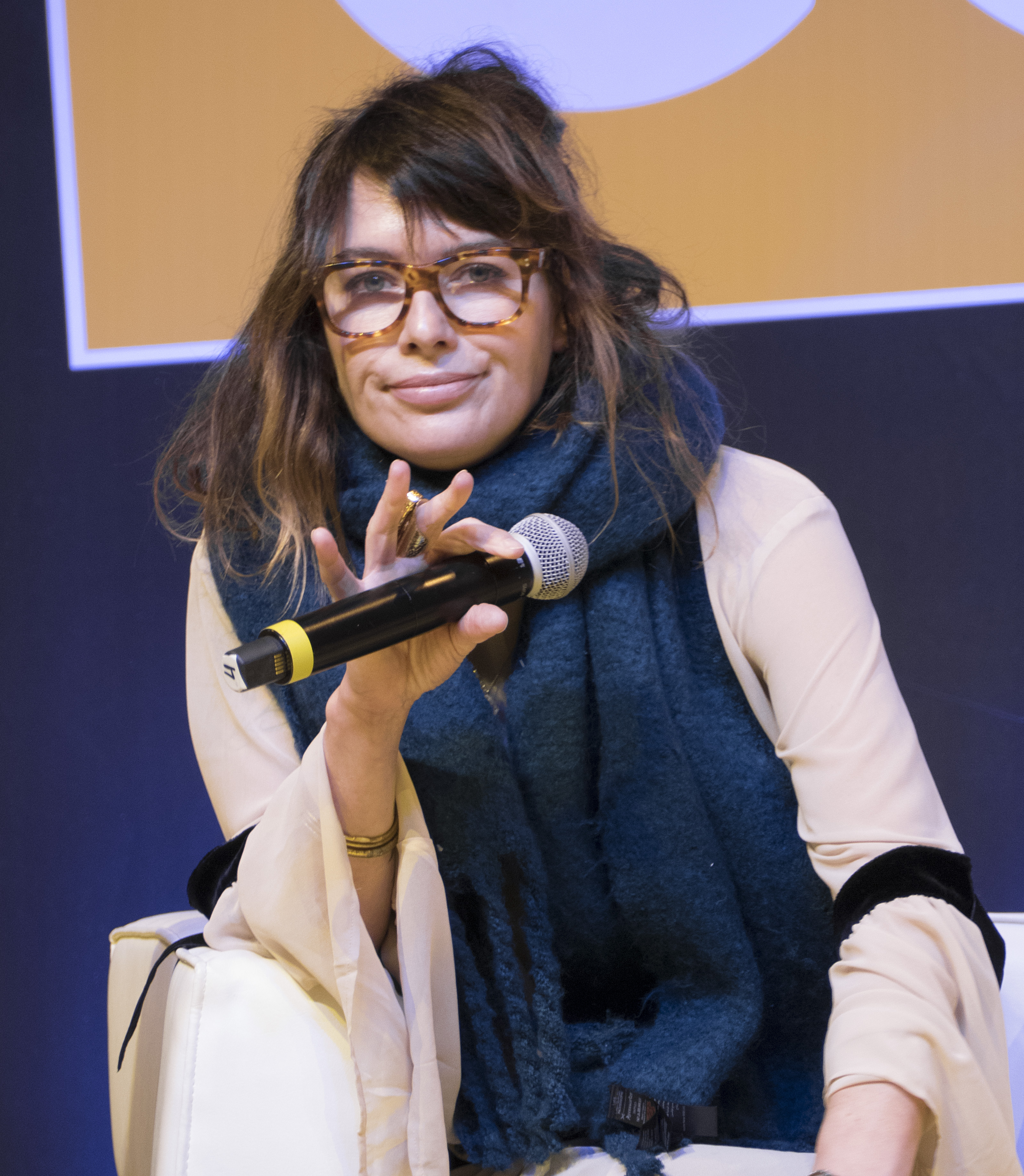
Headey in 2017

After guest-starring in the White Collar episode "Taking Account" in 2011, Headey took on the role of the leader of a drug-dealing gang and the primary villain in the 3D sci-fi action film Dredd (2012), alongside Karl Urban and Olivia Thirlby. Her performance was inspired by punk-rock singer Patti Smith, and on the character, Headey asserted: "I think of [Ma-Ma] like an old great white shark who is just waiting for someone bigger and stronger to show up and kill her [...] she's ready for it. In fact, she can't wait for it to happen [...] She's an addict, so she's dead in that way, but that last knock just hasn't come". Despite a positive critical response, the film flopped at the box office, seeing greater success following its home release; it has since been recognised as a cult film.

Headey joined again with Ethan Hawke to star in The Purge (2013), a "micro-budget" horror film, in which she took on the role of the matriarch of a family who find themselves endangered by a gang of murderers during the annual Purge, a night during which all crime, even murder, is temporarily legal. The film was at the number-one position in the United States, grossing over US$36 million over the weekend; it eventually made US$89.3 million worldwide. She next played shadowhunter Jocelyn Fray/Jocelyn Fairchild in The Mortal Instruments: City of Bones (also 2013), based on the first book of The Mortal Instruments series by Cassandra Clare, and opposite Lily Collins and Jamie Campbell Bower. The film flopped at the box office, and as a result, plans for sequels were eventually canceled.

Following the success of 300, Headey reprised her role as Queen Gorgo in 300: Rise of an Empire, which was released in 2014 to mixed reviews but was a major commercial success, grossing over US$337 million worldwide. In 2014, she also starred in the fantasy adventure film The Adventurer: The Curse of the Midas Box and the biographical film Low Down, which detailed the life of jazz pianist Joe Albany.

=== Later film and television work (2015–present) ===
In 2015, she played the wife of a federal prosecutor running for office who cannot stop himself from sleeping with high-class escorts in the political thriller Zipper, opposite Patrick Wilson.

In the historical action comedy Pride and Prejudice and Zombies, Headey appeared as Lady Catherine de Bourgh, with her former Game of Thrones, Century, and The Contractor co-star Charles Dance. Andrew Barker, of Variety, found her to be "excessively diverting" in what he considered a "tolerable, but not handsome enough" film. In 2017, Headey appeared as a "predictably hard-boiled boss" in the crime thriller Thumper, which premiered at the Tribeca Film Festival, and provided the voiceover for Mercedes A-Class television advertisement and Morgana in Trollhunters.

In November 2020, Headey's production company, Peephole Productions, signed a first-look deal with Platform One Media (now Boat Rocker Studios).

In March 2022, Headey was set to make her feature directorial debut with thriller film Violet based on a novel of the same name by SJI Holliday.

In 2023, she played Dorothy Hunt in the HBO miniseries White House Plumbers, and she starred and executive produced MGM+'s Beacon 23 which lasted two seasons. In 2025, she was in the lead cast alongside Gillian Anderson in Netflix's western series The Abandons.

In 2026, she wrote an episode of HBO's Youth with Sharon Horgan, who also created and starred.

Her upcoming film is Red, White & Royal Wedding, which is a sequel of Red, White & Royal Blue. Her next television series projects include Blackmere and New-Gen.

== Advocacy ==
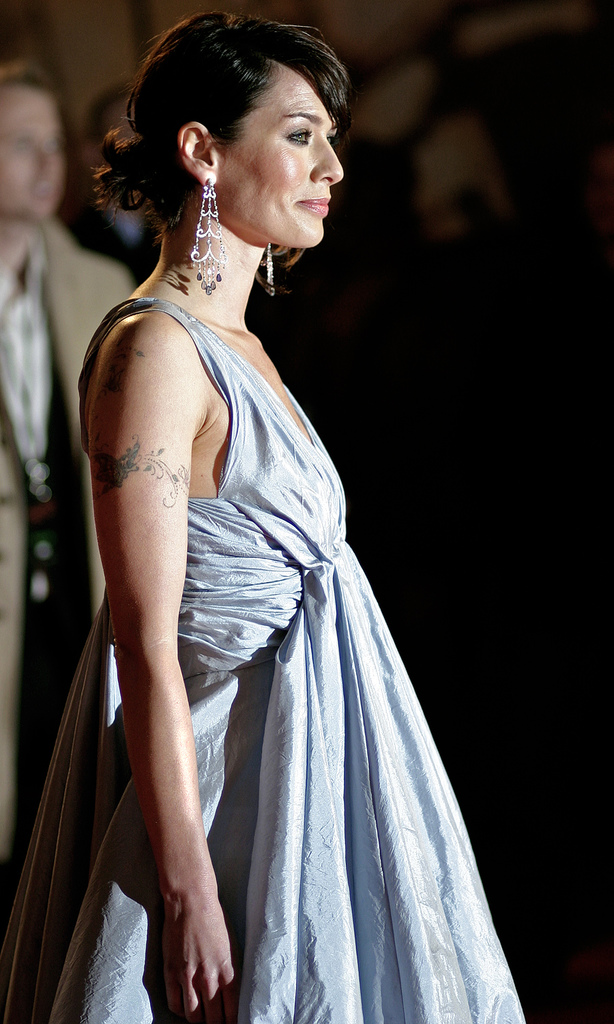
Headey in 2007

Headey supports the LGBT rights organisation NOH8, and in April 2015 appeared on a T-shirt designed by them and sold through Represent.com to raise funds for the cause.

Headey has been involved with humanitarian organisation the International Rescue Committee, advocating for migrants who have been languishing in Greece during the European migrant crisis. She said that in the face of rising populism and the "lost humanity in leadership", people should continue to "fight for the good".

In 2018, Headey did a voice-over for an advertisement by the charity Alzheimer's Research UK, which launched ahead of World Alzheimer's Day (21 September).

Headey supports South Africa's genocide charges against Israel. On 12 January 2024, she contributed to a video series, published by the Palestine Festival of Literature, in support of South Africa's motion against Israel's genocide in Gaza.

== Personal life ==
Headey also had a relationship with the actor Jerome Flynn, to whom she was first linked in 2002; they would later co-star in Game of Thrones together, but by 2014 it was reported that they were no longer on speaking terms. Headey later married musician Peter Loughran in May 2007. Their son was born in 2010, after which she suffered from postnatal depression. Headey and Loughran separated in 2011 and divorced at the end of 2013.

On 10 July 2015, Headey gave birth to a daughter with filmmaker Dan Cadan, a childhood friend who had worked with her on his short film The Devil's Wedding. They had separated by June 2019. In 2020, Headey began dating American actor Marc Menchaca, and the couple married in October 2022.

Lena Headey practices Buddhism. She adopted the religion to help manage her anxiety and find a sense of inner peace in her life. She also has a prominent tattoo of Hindu god Ganesha on her upper arm.

== Appearances ==
Headey has appeared in over 50 films. Her most critically acclaimed and commercially successful films include The Remains of the Day (1993), The Jungle Book (1994), Aberdeen (2000), The Parole Officer (2001), Ripley's Game (2002), The Brothers Grimm (2005), 300 (2007), Laid To Rest (2009), Dredd (2012), The Purge (2013), 300: Rise of an Empire (2014), Thumper (2017), Fighting with My Family (2019), and DC League of Super-Pets (2022).

Her most notable television roles include Band of Gold (1996–1997), Merlin (1998), Terminator: The Sarah Connor Chronicles (2008–2009), Game of Thrones (2011–2019), The Dark Crystal: Age of Resistance (2019), Wizards: Tales of Arcadia (2020), Masters of the Universe: Revelation (2021), and White House Plumbers (2023).

== Awards and nominations ==
Year	Award	Category	Work	Result	Ref.
2001	Silver Iris Award	Best Actress	Aberdeen	Won	
2007	Teen Choice Award	Choice Movie Actress: Action Adventure	300	Nominated	
2008	Saturn Award	Best Supporting Actress	300	Nominated	
2008	Saturn Award	Best Actress on Television	Terminator: The Sarah Connor Chronicles	Nominated	
2008	Scream Award	Best Science Fiction Actress	Terminator: The Sarah Connor Chronicles	Nominated	
2008	SFX Award	Best Television Actress	Terminator: The Sarah Connor Chronicles	Nominated	
2009	Saturn Award	Best Actress on Television	Terminator: The Sarah Connor Chronicles	Nominated	
2009	Scream Award	Best Science Fiction Actress	Terminator: The Sarah Connor Chronicles	Nominated	
2011	Portal Award	Best Actress on Television	Game of Thrones	Nominated	
2011	Scream Award	Best Fantasy Actress	Game of Thrones	Nominated	
2011	Scream Award	Best Ensemble	Game of Thrones	Nominated	
2011	Screen Actors Guild Award	Outstanding Performance by an Ensemble in a Drama Series	Game of Thrones	Nominated	
2011	Women's Image Network Award	Actress Drama Series	Game of Thrones	Nominated	
2012	EWwy Award	Best Supporting Actress, Drama	Game of Thrones	Won	
2012	Golden Nymph Award	Outstanding Actress in a Drama Series	Game of Thrones	Nominated	
2012	Portal Award	Best Actress on Television	Game of Thrones	Won	
2012	SFX Award	Best Television Actress	Game of Thrones	Nominated	
2012	Saturn Award	Best Actress on Television	Game of Thrones	Nominated	
2013	Screen Actors Guild Award	Outstanding Performance by an Ensemble in a Drama Series	Game of Thrones	Nominated	
2014	Primetime Emmy Award	Outstanding Supporting Actress in a Drama Series	Game of Thrones	Nominated	
2014	Screen Actors Guild Award	Outstanding Performance by an Ensemble in a Drama Series	Game of Thrones	Nominated	
2014	Women's Image Network Award	Actress Drama Series	Game of Thrones	Won	
2015	Empire Award	Empire Hero Award	Game of Thrones	Won	
2015	Primetime Emmy Award	Outstanding Supporting Actress in a Drama Series	Game of Thrones	Nominated	
2015	Screen Actors Guild Award	Outstanding Performance by an Ensemble in a Drama Series	Game of Thrones	Nominated	
2016	Primetime Emmy Award	Outstanding Supporting Actress in a Drama Series	Game of Thrones	Nominated	
2016	Critics' Choice Television Award	Best Supporting Actress in a Drama Series	Game of Thrones	Nominated	
2016	Screen Actors Guild Award	Outstanding Performance by an Ensemble in a Drama Series	Game of Thrones	Nominated	
2016	Saturn Award	Best Supporting Actress on Television	Game of Thrones	Nominated	
2017	Golden Globes	Best Supporting Actress – Series, Miniseries or Television Film	Game of Thrones	Nominated	
2017	Satellite Award	Best Supporting Actress – Series, Miniseries or Television Film	Game of Thrones	Nominated	
2017	Saturn Award	Best Actress on Television	Game of Thrones	Nominated	
2017	Screen Actors Guild Award	Outstanding Performance by an Ensemble in a Drama Series	Game of Thrones	Nominated	
2018	Saturn Award	Best Actress on Television	Game of Thrones	Nominated	
2018	Primetime Emmy Award	Outstanding Supporting Actress in a Drama Series	Game of Thrones	Nominated	
2019	Saturn Awards	Best Supporting Actress on a Television Series	Game of Thrones	Nominated	
2019	Primetime Emmy Award	Outstanding Supporting Actress in a Drama Series	Game of Thrones	Nominated	
2020	BAFTA Award	Best British Short Film	The Trap	Nominated	
