= Scream Awards =

Award show dedicated to the horror, sci-fi, and fantasy genres

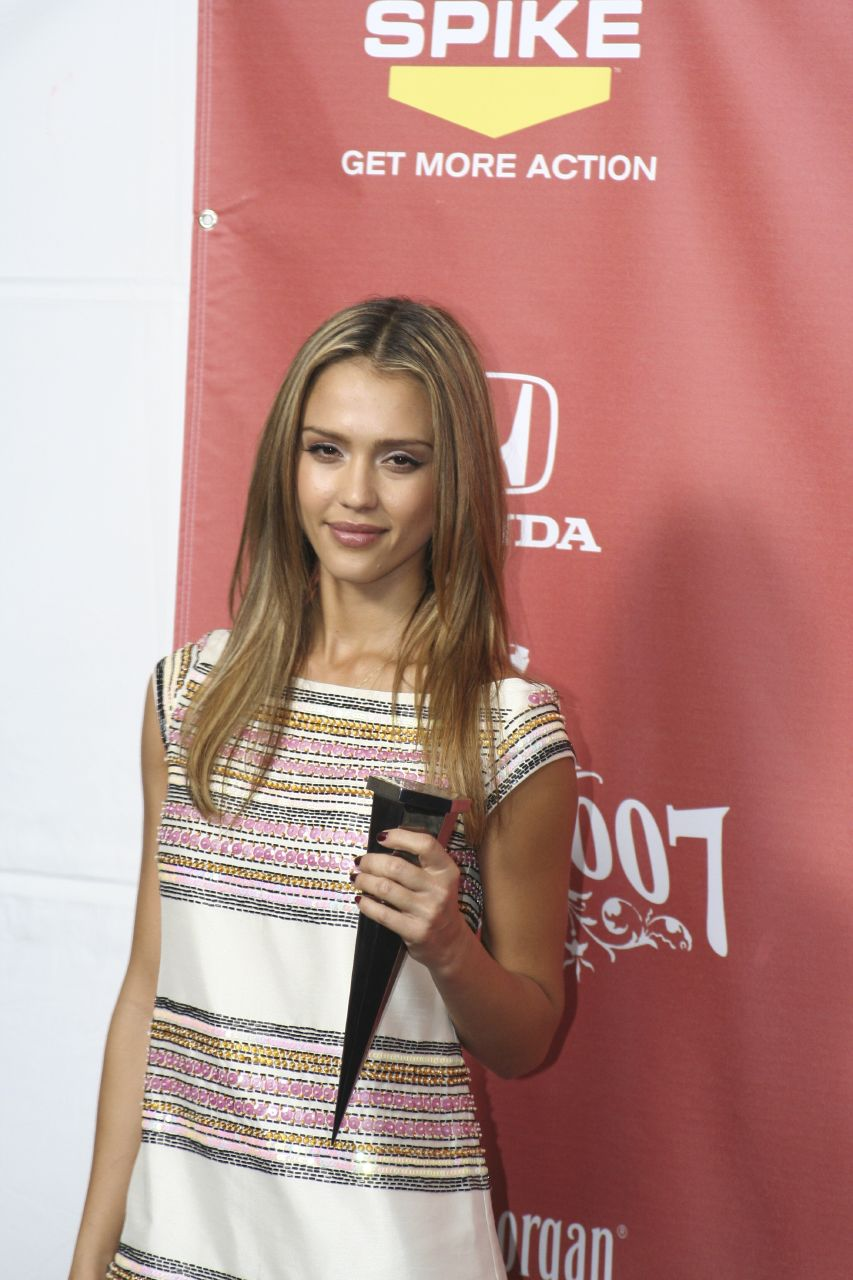
Jessica Alba with a Scream Award. The trophy is a black, seven-faced pyramid, similar to the stake used to kill vampires in fiction.

The Scream Awards were an annual awards show run and broadcast by Spike from 2005 to 2012. The premier Awards Ceremony was known as Spike TV's Scream Awards 2006, however, for subsequent years, the show was relabeled to simply "Scream", followed with the respective year, e.g., Scream 2009.

These events were billed as a commemoration of "all things sci-fi, fantasy, horror and comic book" featuring "the hottest films, TV shows, comics, actors, creators, and icons who have influenced and shaped these genres". Those recognised came from across a number of entertainment platforms including movies, television and comic books.

== Creation ==
The show was created by Casey Patterson, Michael Levitt and Cindy Levitt, who served as the shows executive producers for its six year run. Casey Patterson, who was also the executive vice president of event production, talent development and studio relations for Spike TV, described these awards as "a show for the most passionate fans on earth and beyond ... This is their night to celebrate the magical, mind-bending and super heroic year in movies and the TV shows that they love."

== Production ==
The Scream 2009 nominees were chosen by the Advisory Board of Hollywood and Genre Leaders. Over the 6 years the awards were run, this board was varyingly made up of respected and well-known members of the horror, sci-fi, fantasy and comic book worlds, including Wes Craven, Tim Burton, John Carpenter, Roland Emmerich, Neil Gaiman, Guillermo del Toro, David S. Goyer, Geoff Johns, R. Eric Lieb, Stephen King, Tim Kring, Damon Lindelof, Stephenie Meyer, Frank Miller, Brian Pulido, Eli Roth, Robert Rodriguez, George A. Romero, Zack Snyder, Quentin Tarantino, Judd Winick, Joss Whedon, Jonathan Woods, and Rob Zombie etc. The winners were chosen each year by a process of public online voting on the Spike TV website.

The winners were announced at a live Scream Awards ceremony held in venues around Hollywood (Los Angeles, California). The inaugural 2006 ceremony was held at the Pantages Theatre. From 2007 to 2010, it was held at the Greek Theatre. The 2011 ceremony was held at the backlot of Universal Studios. On the Tuesday directly after the Awards Ceremony, the event was aired on Spike TV, close to Halloween.

#	Name	Date Held	Date Aired
1st	Spike TV's Scream Awards 2006	October 7, 2006	October 10, 2006
2nd	Scream 2007	October 19, 2007	October 23, 2007
3rd	Scream 2008	October 18, 2008	October 21, 2008
4th	Scream 2009	October 17, 2009	October 27, 2009
5th	Scream 2010	October 16, 2010	October 19, 2010
6th	2011 Scream Awards	October 15, 2011	October 18, 2011

== Performances ==
Different live rock acts were included in each year's ceremony, including:-

Artist	Song	Performance Year
Alice Cooper (in "The Monsters of Rock")	Alice Cooper Medley: I Love the Dead and School's Out	2007
Avenged Sevenfold	Scream	2007
KoЯn	Coming Undone	2006
M.I.A.	Teqkilla	2010
My Chemical Romance	Welcome to the Black Parade	2006
Ozzy Osbourne	Not Going Away	2007
Kerli	Walking on Air	2008
The Smashing Pumpkins	G.L.O.W.	2008
Rob Zombie (in "The Monsters of Rock")	Alice Cooper Medley: I Love the Dead and School's Out	2007
Slash (in "The Monsters of Rock")	Alice Cooper Medley: I Love the Dead and School's Out	2007

The 2009 and 2011 ceremonies were the only ones not have any musical performances.

== Categories ==
The Advisory Board of Hollywood and Genre Leaders advised on the composition of the categories each year. The categories featured during the 6 years of these awards included:-

=== Competitive Categories ===
Category	Years	Information
Ultimate Scream	2006 – 2011	
Best Horror Movie	2006 – 2011	
Best Fantasy Movie	2006 – 2011	
Best Science Fiction Movie	2006 – 2011	
Best Thriller	2011 only	
Best Foreign Movie	2006, 2007 & 2009	
Best Independent Movie	2010 & 2011	This category existed only in an "Online Write-in" form for Scream 2010.
Best Sequel	2006 – 2009	
Best Remake	2006 & 2008	
Best 3-D Movie	2010 & 2011	For Scream 2007, this category was called 3-D Top Three and there were only three nominees.
Best Independent Movie	2010	This award category was run as an "Online Write-In" award.
Best Worst Movie	2010	This award category was run as an "Online Write-In" award.
Most Anticipated Movie	2006 and 2009 – 2011	This award went to the most anticipated movie that was to be premiering in the following year. This award category was run as an "Online Write-In" award. In the Scream 2009 ceremony this category in the form of two awards, i.e. "Most Anticipated Fantasy Film" and "Most Anticipated Science Fiction Film".
Breakout Movie of the Year	2006, 2007 & 2009	
Best Scream-Play	2006 – 2011	Occasionally spelt without the hyphen, i.e. 2006, 2008
Best F/X	2006 – 2011	
Best Director	2006 – 2011	
Best Fantasy Actress / Actor	2006 – 2011	In Scream 2006, there was a single category, solely for women, called Fantasy Fox. For Scream 2007, two awards existed, when a second category was added for men called Fantasy Hero. From Scream 2008 onwards, there were two awards called Best Fantasy Actress" and "Best Fantasy Actor.
Best Science Fiction Actress / Actor	2007 – 2011	In Scream 2007, these categories were called Sci-Fi Siren and Sci-fi Star, but for Scream 2008 onwards, these categories were called Best Science Fiction Actress and Best Science Fiction Actor respectively.
Best Horror Actress / Actor	2008 – 2011	
Breakout Performance - Female / Male	2006 – 2011	The original single gender-neutral category of Best Breakout Performance, was divided into two categories, i.e. Breakout Performance - Female and Breakout Performance - Male, from Scream 2009 onwards.
Best Supporting Actress / Actor	2008 – 2011	In Scream 2008, this category existed as a gender-neutral category called Best Supporting Performance. It was divided into two gendered categories from Scream 2009 onwards, i.e. Best Supporting Actress and Best Supporting Actor.
Scream Queen / King	2006 & 2007	Originally, in Scream 2006, the male category was called Most Heroic Performance, which was changed to Scream King for Scream 2007. Both the male and female versions of this category were discontinued from Scream 2008 onwards.
Best Cameo	2007, 2009 – 2011	
Best Ensemble	2006, 2009 – 2011	
Best Rack on the Rack	2006 only	This was one of the 2006 Scream Awards categories with only female nominees.
Best Villain	2006 – 2011	This category was originally called Most Vile Villain, however, from Scream 2008 onwards, the award was renamed Best Villain
Best Superhero	2006 – 2011	
Sexiest Superhero	2006 & 2007	
Most Memorable Mutilation	2006 – 2011	
Scene of the Year Award	2006 – 2011	The Scene of the Year Award title was prefaced with "Holy Shit", containing a '%', '!', or '*' character replacing the 'i' (2006 & 2008-2011), The exception to this was Scream 2007, when the preface of "Jump-From-Your-Seat" was used.
Scream Song of the Year	2009 only	
Best Line	2008	
Best Flesh Scene	2006 only	
Best Chase Scene	2011 only	
Fight Scene of the Year	2009 – 2011	
Best TV Show	2006 – 2011	
Best Television Performance	2010 only	
Best Comic Book or Graphic Novel	2006 – 2011	Originally called Best Comic Book, this category was expanded from Scream 2010 onwards to include graphic novels.
Best Comic Book Movie	2006 – 2011	This category was originally called Best Comic-to-Screen Adaptation, however, from Scream 2008 onwards, it was renamed Best Comic Book Movie.
Best Comic Book Writer	2006 – 2011	
Best Comic Book Artist	2006 – 2011	
Best Screen-to-Comic Adaptation	2006 – 2008	This category was called Best Scream to Comic Adaptation for Scream 2008.
Most Shocking Comic Book Plot Twist	2006 – 2008	Called just Most Shocking Comic Book Twist for 2006 and 2007.
Best Internet Parody	2006	

=== Special awards ===
Category	Years	Information
Comic-Con Icon	2006 – 2011	This award was presented to individuals or organizations that have been instrumental in bringing comics and/or the popular arts to a wider audience. The award was bestowed each year by Comic-Con in partnership with Scream. After the discontinuance of the Scream Awards this category was presented on-site as an award at Comic-Con's annual Comic-Con event.
25th Anniversary Award	2009	
Scream Mastermind	2006, 2008 & 2009	
Scream Legend	2008	
Scream Immortal	2008	
Ruthless Filmmaker	2006	
Scream Rock Immortal	2006, 2007 & 2009	
Heroine / Hero	2007, 2010 & 2011	
Maverick	2011	This award recognized the fearless and intriguing bodies of work an actor/actress has done in the genres.
Ultimate	2011	
Visionary	2011	

== Farewell Tributes ==
Special tributes were given in some year for the conclusion of long-running shows, i.e. 2010 and 2011.

== Reception ==
There was a consensus that these awards recognised works of genres that were normally unrecognised. Casey Patterson said of the Scream Awards that it "aims to do for superhero, horror and fantasy films what the MTV Movie Awards did for teen comedies by honoring genres usually overlooked by high-brow Academy Award voters ... This event has been long overdue". Zack Snyder said, at the 2008 Scream Awards, "There's a feeling that film and comic books and all these genres that didn't used to get respect are having this truly dynamic moment right now."

Of those traditionally unrecognised genres, commentators saw the Scream Awards' recognition of the comic book genre as especially significant. In 2008, Casey Patterson said "the event began three years ago with an emphasis on horror, a genre that was surging at that time thanks to movies such as the Saw films and Hostel. But in subsequent years, the show widened to embrace comic books and fantasy." Geoff Boucher (Los Angeles Times), said "The Scream Awards presented a pop-culture environment where film-makers like Dark Knight director Christopher Nolan shared the same stage as comic-book writers such as Mike Mignola, creator of Hellboy. The LA times reported Mike Mignola as saying, when talking of Scream 2008, that "in the old days Hollywood would strip-mine comics and scoff at the creators. Now, they walk on the same red carpet, which on Saturday night had giant posters of the Green Lantern and Spider-Man above it.

== Target audience & Sponsorship ==
=== Young males ===
The male-centric nature of this awards ceremony's target audience was recognised. Ray Richmond, from the Hollywood Reporter, said "In hitching its wagon to Ultimate Fighting Championship, Star Wars marathons, and no fewer than three awards programs — Guys' Choice Awards (established 2007), Scream Awards (established 2006) and Video Game Awards (established 2003), the network has fulfilled its mission to provide action-themed comfort food for its male viewership. Juliet Corsinita, the media editor of Taco Bell (one of the Scream Awards sponsors for its entire 6-year run), said that with respect to the Scream Awards, Taco Bell, whose core customers were "young men who eat fast food", has "a presenting sponsorship which over-delivered on its audience by 76%".

=== Halloween ===
Captain Morgan's initial Scream Awards sponsorship was part of it push for its product "to be to Halloween what Guinness is to St. Patrick's Day." Arthur Shapiro, Alcohol industry consultant, said "No one has locked up Halloween yet. The Captain has the horsepower to do it."

=== Sponsors ===
With the exception of Taco Bell, the sponsors for each year's awards ceremony varied: -

Sponsor	2006	2007	2008	2009	2010	2011
Taco Bell	X	X	X	X	X	X
Captain Morgan	X	X	X			
Honda		X				
Truth (R)		X				
FreeCreditScore				X	X	
Geico				X	X	X
Subaru			X	X	X	X

== Ratings ==
In 2009, the Scream Awards drew a total of 9.9 million viewers over its four telecasts. In the 18-34 male demo, the awards drew a 0.7 rating for the first telecast.

In 2010, the initial Tuesday broadcast of the Scream Awards drew only 800,000 viewers for the 9 p.m. premier and 471,000 for the 11 p.m. telecast.

In 2011, the Scream Awards notably underpreformed drawing only 698,000 viewers over the week. This placed it 15th in a Horror Society rating ranking of horror content for that week, just below Scare Tactics on 793,000 viewers, compared to the two highest rating shows broadcast in that week of Terra Nova on 7,970,000 and The Walking Dead on 7,300,000 viewers.

== Discontinuance ==
The Scream Awards ceremonies were discontinued in 2011, a move attributed to the dwindling popularity of the event and Spike TV's re-formatting (including even a change of their name to Paramount). There were a total of 8 Scream Awards.

== See also ==
- Saturn Awards
