= Casey Patterson =

American television executive

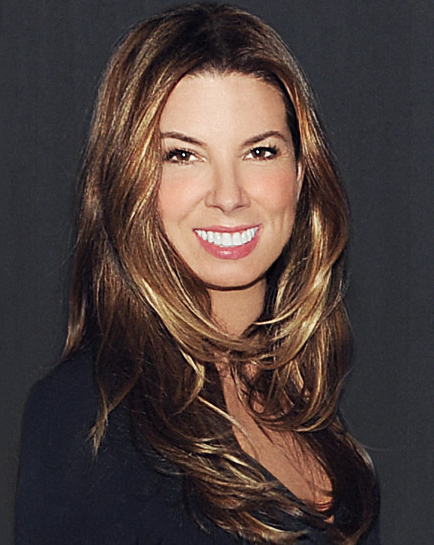
- Born: Cassandra Patterson
- Occupations: Television executive, producer, director
- Years active: 1998–present

Casey Patterson is an American television executive, producer and director.

Patterson is credited as the creator of The Comedy Awards, the Guys Choice Awards, the Scream Awards, and was the co-creator of The Sharon Osbourne Show. She also produced and created the One Night Only specials, starting with Eddie Murphy in 2012, Don Rickles in 2014, and Alec Baldwin in 2017. As an executive she has produced and overseen various specials and awards shows, including The Concert for New York City, The Concert of the Century at the White House, and the Diamond Jubilee of Elizabeth II at Buckingham Palace.

== Early career ==
Patterson started her career in 1997 as a talent booker at MTV Networks and was promoted to Director of Talent Development at VH1 where she worked on The Concert for New York City, the VH1 Vogue Fashion Awards, VH1 Divas Live, Pop-Up Video, Behind the Music, Saturday Night Live's 25th Anniversary Special, and the "Concert of the Century" at the White House. During this time period, she also worked on The Fox Billboard Music Awards, NBC's "Concert for America", and CMT's Flameworthy Awards.

Patterson was the first woman hired by Spike TV after it launched in 2003 and was integral to shaping the brand, with publications such as the LA Times and Multichannel News profiling her success at the network and dubbing her "The Dude Whisperer" and "A Woman to Watch in Entertainment."

== Career ==
=== Casey Patterson Entertainment ===
Casey Patterson Entertainment is a production company for content, live events, and talent-driven series and specials with offices in New York City and Los Angeles. Casey Patterson is a four-time Emmy and two-time PGA Awards-nominated executive producer who has created an array of programming during her 20-year tenure at Viacom.

=== As Executive producer ===
Patterson was an Executive Producer for The 2003 GQ Men of the Year Awards and The 2004 Spike VGA Video Game Awards. In 2006 she created and executive produced two awards shows for Spike: Scream and Guys Choice.

In 2009 Patterson was promoted to Executive Vice President of Talent Development, Event Production and Studio Relations for the Viacom Entertainment Group, which includes Spike, Comedy Central and TV Land. As EVP Patterson became the executive producer of The TV Land Awards and created The Comedy Awards for Comedy Central.

=== Lip Sync Battle ===
Lip Sync Battle is an American musical reality competition television series which premiered on April 2, 2015, on Paramount Network, formerly known as Spike. The show is based on an idea by Stephen Merchant and John Krasinski, in which celebrities battle each other with lip sync performances. The idea was first realized as a recurring segment on The Tonight Show Starring Jimmy Fallon before being developed into a separate show.

The premiere episode was the highest-rated premiere in Spike's history. Lip Sync Battle has been a hit show for the network; it was renewed for a second season, which premiered on January 7, 2016. An hour-long holiday special aired on November 19, 2015. In January 2016, the series was renewed for a third season, which premiered on October 12, 2016. The series' success has led to the creation of various international adaptations. In April 2017, the series was renewed for a fourth season, which premiered with a live special on January 18, 2018. In August 2018, the show was renewed for a fifth season to premiere in 2019.

=== Spike Video Game Awards ===
Patterson has been involved with the Spike Video Game Awards since it launched in 2003 and has been an Executive Producer since 2004. The VGAs honor the best in gaming and serve as the largest annual global platform for world premiering new titles from major video game publishers.

=== Guys Choice ===
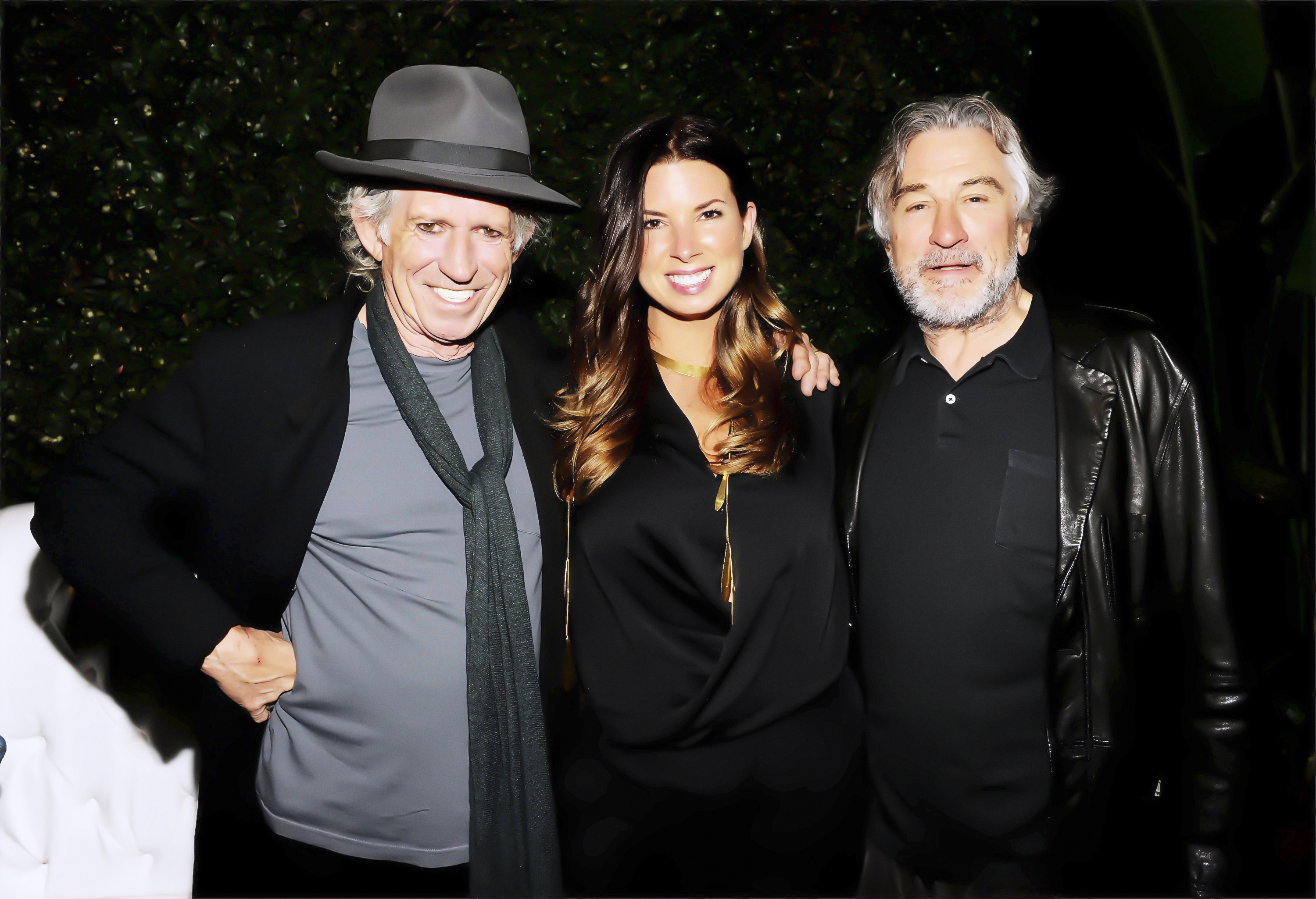
Patterson with Robert De Niro and Keith Richards at Guys Choice Awards

Patterson created Guys Choice in 2006 and has been Executive Producer since its inception.

Guys Choice caught the attention of media due to its irreverent tone and was dubbed "one of the best A-List parties in town" by Entertainment Weekly for presenting awards like the "Brass Balls," given in 2009 to actor and director Clint Eastwood, and the "Decade of Hotness" award given to actresses such as Charlize Theron, Halle Berry, Jennifer Aniston, and most recently, Sandra Bullock.

The show's signature award, "The Guy Movie Hall of Fame," reunited Brad Pitt, Edward Norton and David Fincher to induct Fight Club. The following year they reunited Robert De Niro and Ray Liotta for Goodfellas, presented by James Gandolfini.

As Executive Producer, Patterson also put an emphasis on the military, partnering with the US Armed Forces to feature and honor veterans and active duty officers and giving out the "Troops Choice" award, which is voted on by enlisted military personnel. Past winners include Ben Affleck, Justin Timberlake, Vin Diesel, and Mark Wahlberg. In 2010 the award was given to Sandra Bullock, who accepted the award in her first public appearance following her highly publicized split from Jesse James.

=== Scream Awards ===
Patterson co-created and executive produced The Scream Awards, a two-hour event honoring the best in comic books, horror, science fiction, and fantasy. Scream was the first awards show dedicated to honoring the "fan boy" genres. It immediately garnered the attention of movie studios and genre favorites such as J.J. Abrams, Christopher Nolan, and Quentin Tarantino, all of whom were early supporters and attended multiple ceremonies.

As Executive Producer, Patterson partnered with Comic-Con International to present the "Comic-Con Icon" award annually. In 2008 the award was presented to George Lucas when, in a rare public appearance, Lucas arrived onstage accompanied by three hundred Imperial Stormtroopers from the "Star Wars" films.

=== TV Land Award ===
The TV Land Awards is a two-hour prime time special celebrating the best of classic TV and popular culture, featuring all-star reunions of legendary television casts such as The Cosby Show, Family Ties, Freaks and Geeks, Ally McBeal, M.A.S.H., Happy Days, Mary Tyler Moore, and The Dick Van Dyke Show.

=== The Comedy Awards ===
In 2011, Patterson created and executive produced the inaugural Comedy Awards with Don Mischer productions. The show was created to honor outstanding achievement in comedy, a genre traditionally overlooked at other awards ceremonies. To legitimize the proceedings, Patterson assembled a board of directors to select the categories and nominees composed of Jon Stewart, Seth MacFarlane, Jim Burroughs, Carol Burnett, Chris Rock, Conan O'Brien and other comedy luminaries. Winners were then chosen by a 1,500 member voting body composed of members of the comedy community including producers, writers, directors, and stand-up comedians.

Patterson partnered with the John W. Carson Foundation to name the show's highest honor after Johnny Carson. The first ever "Johnny Carson Award for Comedic Excellence" was presented to David Letterman by Bill Murray and was given the following year to legendary comedian Don Rickles by Jon Stewart and Robert De Niro.

The inaugural ceremony was simulcast on April 10 on CMT, Comedy Central, Logo TV, Nick at Nite, Spike, TV Land and VH1. Patterson was also the Executive in Charge of Production for the pre-show "Between Two Ferns: A Fairytale of New York," the televised debut of the comedy web series Between Two Ferns starring Zach Galifianakis.

=== Eddie Murphy: One Night Only ===
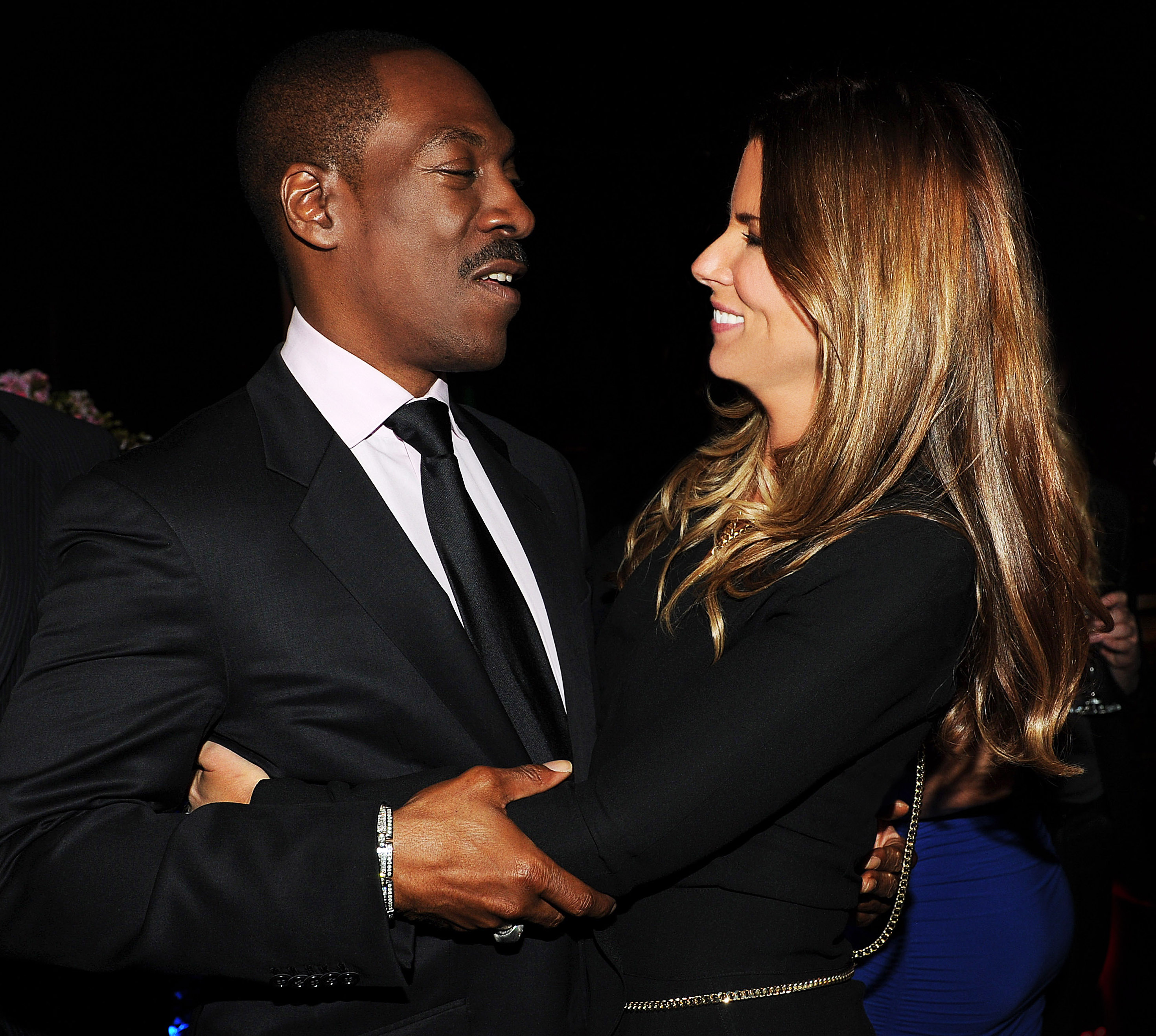
Patterson with Eddie Murphy

In 2012, Patterson created and executive produced the special "Eddie Murphy: One Night Only" with Don Mischer productions. The special marked the first time the elusive Murphy ever agreed to be honored. The event took place just months after his departure as host of the 84th Academy Awards and included presentations from Murphy's friends and co-stars including Chris Rock, Jamie Foxx, Tracy Morgan, Adam Sandler, Stevie Wonder, Tyler Perry and Arsenio Hall.

=== One Night Only: An All-Star Comedy Tribute to Don Rickles ===
In 2014, Patterson honored another comedic legend with the special she executive produced "One Night Only: An All-Star Comedy Tribute to Don Rickles" with Don Mischer productions. The special was one of the only shows dedicated to Don Rickles' prolific sixty plus year career. Recorded at New York City's famous Apollo Theater, Jerry Seinfeld was the Master Of Ceremonies for the two-hour special. Monologues were performed by Johnny Depp, Martin Scorsese and Robert De Niro, Jon Stewart, David Letterman, Tracy Morgan, Brian Williams, and Amy Poehler and Tina Fey. Recorded segments included bits from Bob Newhart, Bill Cosby, Jimmy Kimmel, and Eddie Murphy.

== Other work ==
=== The Sharon Osbourne Show ===
Patterson was the Talent Producer for the Diamond Jubilee of Elizabeth II in 2003, where she hired Sharon Osbourne in her first TV hosting role. They went on to co-create "The Sharon Osbourne Show", which ran for one season in syndication. A similar but unrelated show of the same name appeared on the UK network ITV in 2006.

=== Charitable Work ===
Patterson has been active in Viacom's charity initiatives and has played a key role in VH1's Save the Music Foundation, Spike's True Dads campaign, the Hire a Vet initiative, and the American Comedy Fund (with the Entertainment Industry Foundation, the Motion Picture Television Fund, and the Actors Fund). She has also served on the board for the NY Center for Autism.

== Personal life ==
Patterson grew up in Florida, St. Croix, and the United Kingdom. She currently resides in New York City.

== Honors and awards ==
- (2018) Emmy Nomination - Outstanding Structured Reality Program "Lip Sync Battle" (as Executive Producer)
- (2017) Emmy Nomination - Outstanding Structured Reality Program "Lip Sync Battle" (as Executive Producer)
- (2016) Emmy Nomination - Outstanding Structured Reality Program "Lip Sync Battle" (as Executive Producer)
- (2016) Emmy Nomination - Outstanding Television Movie "A Very Murray Christmas" (as Co-Executive Producer)
- (1998) Daytime Emmy Nomination – Outstanding Game/Audience Participation Show "Hollywood Squares" (as Producer)
- (2008) Named "Woman to Watch in Entertainment" by Multichannel News.

== Selected credits ==
- Lip Sync Battle LIVE: A Michael Jackson Celebration
- Lip Sync Battle
- Lip Sync Battle Shorties
- Rock the Troops with Dwayne Johnson’s Seven Bucks Production
- MTV Movie & TV Awards
- Guys Choice
- Taraji’s White Hot Holidays
- Spike’s One Night Only: Alec Baldwin
- Spike’s One Night Only: An All-Star Comedy Tribute to Don Rickles
- Spike’s One Night Only: Eddie Murphy
- Between Two Ferns: A Fairytale of New York
- The Concert of the Century at the White House
- NBC's Concert for America
- The Comedy Awards
- Scream
- TV Land Awards
- VH1 Divas Live
- The Concert for New York City
- Saturday Night Live 25 (anniversary special)
- Spike VGAs (Video Game Awards)
- 2002 Billboard Music Awards
- Harry Potter 20th Anniversary
- VH1/Vogue Fashion Awards
