= Natalie Portman filmography =

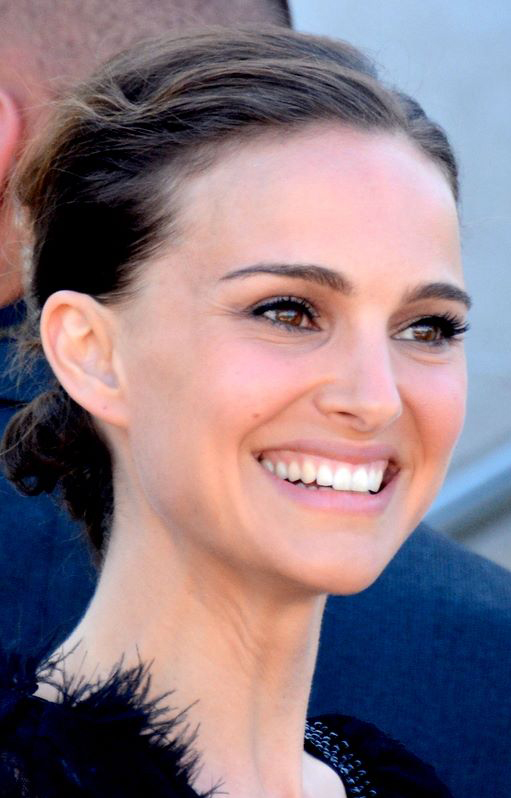
Portman at the 2015 Cannes Film Festival

Natalie Portman is an Israeli-American actress and filmmaker. She made her film debut in Luc Besson's action thriller Léon: The Professional, which starred her as the young protégée of a hitman. She followed this by appearing in Michael Mann's crime thriller Heat (1995), Ted Demme's romantic comedy Beautiful Girls (1996), and Tim Burton's science fiction comedy Mars Attacks! (1996). Three years later, her supporting role as the precocious, responsible daughter of a narcissistic mother played by Susan Sarandon in the drama Anywhere but Here earned Portman her first Golden Globe Award nomination. In the same year, she played Padmé Amidala in the first of the Star Wars prequel trilogy, Star Wars: Episode I – The Phantom Menace, which brought her international recognition. She reprised the role in its sequels Star Wars: Episode II – Attack of the Clones (2002), and Star Wars: Episode III – Revenge of the Sith (2005).

For her performance as a stripper in Mike Nichols' romantic drama Closer (2004), she won the Golden Globe Award for Best Supporting Actress – Motion Picture, and received a nomination for the Academy Award for Best Supporting Actress. Two years later Portman portrayed vigilante Evey Hammond in the political thriller V for Vendetta for which she won the Saturn Award for Best Actress. In the same year, she hosted Saturday Night Live. In 2009, she starred as an adulteress in The Other Woman, which she also executively produced. In 2010, Portman's performance as a mentally tortured ballerina in Darren Aronofsky's psychological horror Black Swan won her the Academy Award for Best Actress, the Golden Globe Award for Best Actress in a Motion Picture – Drama, and the BAFTA Award for Best Actress in a Leading Role.

In 2011, she appeared in the comedies No Strings Attached and Your Highness. In the same year, Portman also played Jane Foster, the titular superhero's scientist girlfriend in Thor. She reprised the role in its sequels Thor: The Dark World (2013) and Thor: Love and Thunder (2022), she also reprised the role in Avengers: Endgame (2019). In 2015, she starred in Terrence Malick's romantic drama Knight of Cups, and made her feature film directorial debut with A Tale of Love and Darkness, an adaptation of Amos Oz's autobiographical novel of the same name; she also starred in the film. The following year, Portman portrayed Jacqueline Kennedy in Jackie, for which she received nominations for Best Actress at the BAFTA Awards, Golden Globe Awards, and Academy Awards. In 2018, Portman starred in the science fiction horror film Annihilation, and the drama Vox Lux.

== Film ==
Year	Title	Role(s)	Notes	Ref.
1994	Developing	Nina	Short film	
1994	Léon: The Professional	Mathilda Lando		
1995	Heat	Lauren Gustafson		
1996	Beautiful Girls	Marty		
1996	Everyone Says I Love You	Laura Dandridge		
1996	Mars Attacks!	Taffy Dale		
1999	Star Wars: Episode I – The Phantom Menace	Padmé Amidala		
1999	Anywhere but Here	Ann August		
2000	Where the Heart Is	Novalee Nation		
2001	Zoolander	Herself	Cameo	
2002	Star Wars: Episode II – Attack of the Clones	Padmé Amidala		
2003	Cold Mountain	Sara		
2004	Garden State	Samantha		
2004	True	Francine	Short film	
2004	Closer	Alice Ayres / Jane Jones		
2005	Domino One	Dominique Bellamy		
2005	Star Wars: Episode III – Revenge of the Sith	Padmé Amidala		
2005	Free Zone	Rebecca		
2006	V for Vendetta	Evey Hammond		
2006	Paris, je t'aime	Francine	Segment: "Faubourg Saint-Denis"	
2006	Goya's Ghosts	Inés Bilbatúa / Alicia		
2007	My Blueberry Nights	Leslie		
2007	Hotel Chevalier	Rhett	Short film	
2007	The Darjeeling Limited	Rhett	Cameo	
2007	Mr. Magorium's Wonder Emporium	Molly Mahoney		
2008	The Other Boleyn Girl	Anne Boleyn		
2008	Eve	—N/a	Director and writer only; short film	
2008	New York, I Love You	Rifka Malone	Actor for segment: "Mira Nair"; Director and writer for segment: "Natalie Portman"	
2009	The Other Woman	Emilia Greenleaf	Also executive producer	
2009	Brothers	Grace Cahill		
2010	Hesher	Nicole	Also producer	
2010	Black Swan	Nina Sayers / White Swan / Odette		
2010	I'm Still Here	Herself	Mockumentary	
2011	No Strings Attached	Emma Kurtzman	Also executive producer	
2011	Your Highness	Isabel		
2011	Thor	Jane Foster		
2013	Illusions & Mirrors	Young Woman	Short film	
2013	Thor: The Dark World	Jane Foster		
2015	The Seventh Fire	—N/a	Executive producer only; documentary	
2015	Knight of Cups	Elizabeth		
2015	The Heyday of the Insensitive Bastards	Laura	Segment: "Lacunae"	
2015	A Tale of Love and Darkness	Fania Klausner	Also director and writer	
2015	Reset	Herself	Documentary	
2015	Jane Got a Gun	Jane Hammond	Also producer	
2016	Pride and Prejudice and Zombies	—N/a	Producer only	
2016	Jackie	Jacqueline Kennedy		
2016	Planetarium	Laura Barlow		
2017	Song to Song	Rhonda		
2017	Eating Animals	Narrator (voice)	Also producer; documentary	
2018	Annihilation	Lena		
2018	Dolphin Reef	Narrator (voice)	Documentary	
2018	Vox Lux	Celeste Montgomery	Also executive producer	
2018	This Changes Everything	Herself	Documentary	
2018	The Death & Life of John F. Donovan	Sam Turner		
2019	Avengers: Endgame	Jane Foster (archive footage)	Archive footage from Thor: The Dark World and new voice-over	
2019	Lucy in the Sky	Lucy Cola		
2022	Thor: Love and Thunder	Jane Foster / Mighty Thor		
2023	May December	Elizabeth Berry	Also producer	
2025	Arco	Jeanne / Mikki 2 (voice)	English dub; Also producer	
2025	Fountain of Youth	Charlotte Purdue		
2025	The Twits	Mary Muggle Wump	Voice role	
2026	The Gallerist	Polina Polinski	Also producer	
2026	Good Sex †	Ally	Post-production; also producer	
TBA	Pumping Black †		Filming; also producer	

Key
†	Denotes films that have not yet been released

== Television ==
Year	Title	Role	Notes	Ref.
2001	R2-D2: Beneath the Dome	Herself	Mockumentary	
2003–04	Sesame Street	Herself	3 episodes	
2004	Hitler's Pawn: The Margaret Lambert Story	Narrator (voice)	Documentary	
2004	Long Way Round	Herself	Episode: "Calgary to New York"	
2006–18	Saturday Night Live	Herself (host)	2 episodes	
2006	The Armenian Genocide	Aurora Mardiganian (voice)	Documentary	
2007–12	The Simpsons	Darcy (voice)	2 episodes	
2007	Saving a Species: Gorillas on the Brink	Host	Documentary	
2017	Angie Tribeca	Christina Craft	Episode: "This Sounds Unbelievable, But CSI: Miami Did It"	
2021	What If...?	Jane Foster (voice)	Episode: "What If... Thor Were an Only Child?"	
2021	Bluey	Whale Documentary Narrator (voice)	Episode: "Whale Watching"	
2023	Secrets of the Elephants	Narrator (voice)	4 episodes; documentary	
2023	Angel City	Herself	3 episodes; also executive producer	
2024	Lady in the Lake	Maddie Schwartz	Miniseries; also executive producer	

Key
†	Denotes television productions that have not yet been released

== Theater ==
Year	Title	Role	Venue	Ref.
1997–1998	The Diary of a Young Girl	Anne Frank	Music Box Theatre	
2001	The Seagull	Nina Zarechnaya	Delacorte Theater	

== Music videos ==
Year	Title	Artist(s)	Role	Ref.
2006	"Natalie's Rap"	The Lonely Island	Herself	
2007	"Dance Tonight"	Paul McCartney	Ghost	
2008	"Carmensita"	Devendra Banhart	Princess Carmensita Saplingita	
2012	"My Valentine"	Paul McCartney	Herself	
2017	"My Willing Heart"	James Blake	Herself	
2018	"Natalie's Rap 2.0"	The Lonely Island	Herself	
2020	"Imagine"	Gal Gadot & Friends	Herself	
2022	"Haute saison"	Rob & Jack Lahana	Director only	

== See also ==
- List of awards and nominations received by Natalie Portman
