= List of awards and nominations received by Natalie Portman =

Natalie Portman awards and nominations
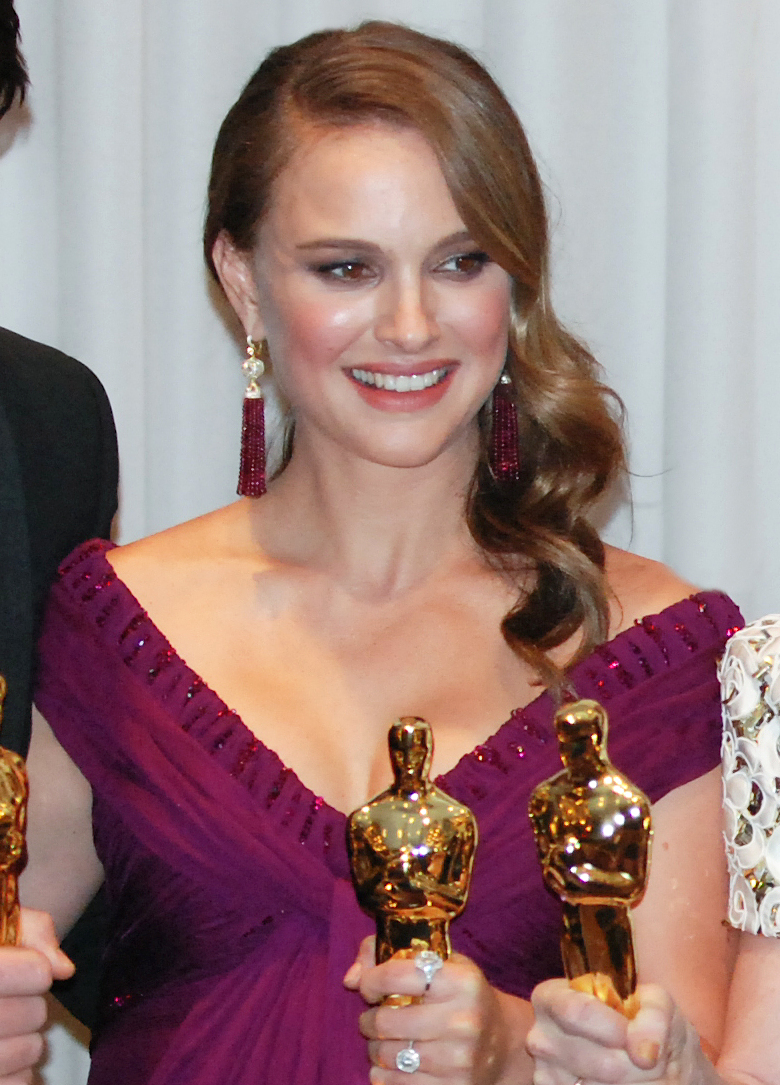
- Portman at the 83rd Academy Awards in 2011
Awards and nominations
Award	Wins	Nominations
Academy Awards	1	4
Actor Awards	1	3
BAFTAs	1	4
Critics' Choice Awards	2	5
Golden Globe Awards	2	5

Totals (Note: Certain award groups do not simply award one winner. They acknowledge several different recipients, have runners-up, and have third place. Since this is a specific recognition and is different from losing an award, runner-up mentions are considered wins in this award tally. For simplification and to avoid errors, each award in this list has been presumed to have had a prior nomination.)
- Wins: 39
- Nominations: 87

Natalie Portman is an Israeli-born American actress. She has received various accolades including an Academy Award, a British Academy Film Award, two Critics' Choice Awards, two Golden Globe Awards, and an Actor Award.

Portman's first notable awards nomination came for her role as Ann in the coming-of-age film Anywhere but Here (1999), for which she was nominated for the Golden Globe Award for Best Supporting Actress – Motion Picture. Portman's performance as a mysterious stripper in Mike Nichols' romantic drama Closer (2004) earned her the Golden Globe Award for Best Supporting Actress – Motion Picture, and nominations for the Academy Award for Best Supporting Actress, the BAFTA Award for Best Actress in a Supporting Role, She portrayed Evey Hammond in dystopian political thriller V for Vendetta (2005) earning nominations for a Saturn Award, and a Scream Award.

She won the Academy Award for Best Actress for her role as Nina Sayers, a mentally tortured ballet dancer in Darren Aronofsky's psychological horror Black Swan (2010). The role also earned her the BAFTA Award for Best Actress in a Leading Role, the Golden Globe Award for Best Actress in a Motion Picture – Drama and the Actor Award for Outstanding Actress in a Leading Role. For her portrayal of Jacqueline Kennedy in Pablo Larraín's biographical drama Jackie (2016), she received the Critics' Choice Movie Award for Best Actress. The performance also earned her nominations for the Academy Award, BAFTA Award, Golden Globe Award, and Actor Award.

Portman's portrayal of Elizabeth Berry, an actress studying to portray a controversial woman for an upcoming film project, in Todd Haynes' psychological black comedy drama May December (2023) earned her nominations for the Golden Globe Award for Best Actress in a Motion Picture – Musical or Comedy and the Independent Spirit Award for Best Lead Performance. For her philanthropic activism she honored with the Ongoing Commitment Award given by the Environmental Media Association in 2011.

== Major associations ==
=== Academy Awards ===
Year	Category	Nominated work	Result	Ref.
2005	Best Supporting Actress	Closer	Nominated	
2011	Best Actress	Black Swan	Won	
2017	Best Actress	Jackie	Nominated	
2026	Best Animated Feature	Arco	Nominated	

=== Actor Awards ===
Year	Category	Nominated work	Result	Ref.
2011	Outstanding Cast in a Motion Picture	Black Swan	Nominated	
2011	Outstanding Female Actor in a Leading Role	Black Swan	Won	
2017	Outstanding Female Actor in a Leading Role	Jackie	Nominated	

=== BAFTA Awards ===
Year	Category	Nominated work	Result	Ref.
British Academy Film Awards
2004	Best Actress in a Supporting Role	Closer	Nominated	
2010	Best Actress in a Leading Role	Black Swan	Won	
2016	Best Actress in a Leading Role	Jackie	Nominated	
2025	Best Children's & Family Film	Arco	Nominated	

=== Critics' Choice Awards ===
Year	Category	Nominated work	Result	Ref.
Critics' Choice Movie Awards
2005	Best Supporting Actress	Closer	Nominated	
2005	Best Acting Ensemble	Closer	Nominated	
2011	Best Actress	Black Swan	Won	
2016	Best Actress	Jackie	Won	
Critics' Choice Super Awards
2023	Best Actress in a Superhero Movie	Thor: Love and Thunder	Nominated	

=== Golden Globe Awards ===
Year	Category	Nominated work	Result	Ref.
2000	Best Supporting Actress – Motion Picture	Anywhere but Here	Nominated	
2005	Best Supporting Actress – Motion Picture	Closer	Won	
2011	Best Actress in a Motion Picture – Drama	Black Swan	Won	
2017	Best Actress in a Motion Picture – Drama	Jackie	Nominated	
2024	Best Actress – Motion Picture Comedy or Musical	May December	Nominated	

== Miscellaneous accolades ==
Awards and nominations received by Natalie Portman
Award	Year	Category	Nominated work	Result	Ref.
AACTA International Awards	2017	Best Actress	Jackie	Nominated	
Austin Film Critics Association	2010	Best Actress	Black Swan	Won	
Austin Film Critics Association	2016	Best Actress	Jackie	Nominated	
Alliance of Women Film Journalists	2010	Best Actress	Black Swan	Nominated	
Alliance of Women Film Journalists	2010	Bravest Performance Award	Black Swan	Won	
Alliance of Women Film Journalists	2010	Unforgettable Moment Award	Black Swan	Won	
Alliance of Women Film Journalists	2010	Best Depiction of Nudity, Sexuality, or Seduction	Black Swan	Nominated	
Alliance of Women Film Journalists	2016	Best Actress	Jackie	Nominated	
British Independent Film Awards	2007	Best Actress	Mr. Magorium's Wonder Emporium	Nominated	
Boston Society of Film Critics	2010	Best Actress	Black Swan	Won	
Boston Society of Film Critics	2016	Best Actress	Jackie	Runner-up	
Blockbuster Entertainment Awards	2000	Favorite Actress – Action	Star Wars: Episode I – The Phantom Menace	Nominated	
Cannes Film Festival	2015	Caméra d'Or	A Tale of Love and Darkness	Nominated	
Chicago Film Critics Association	2009	Best Supporting Actress	Brothers	Nominated	
Chicago Film Critics Association	2010	Best Actress	Black Swan	Won	
Chicago Film Critics Association	2016	Best Actress	Jackie	Won	
Chicago Film Critics Association	2023	Best Actress	May December	Nominated	
Dallas-Fort Worth Film Critics Association Awards	2010	Best Actress	Black Swan	Won	
Dallas-Fort Worth Film Critics Association Awards	2016	Best Actress	Jackie	Won	
Detroit Film Critics Society Awards	2010	Best Actress	Black Swan	Nominated	
Detroit Film Critics Society Awards	2016	Best Actress	Jackie	Nominated	
Dublin Film Critics' Circle	2011	Best Actress	Black Swan	3rd place	
Dublin Film Critics' Circle	2017	Best Actress (tied with Isabelle Huppert for Elle)	Jackie	Won	
Dorian Awards	2011	Film Performance of the Year	Black Swan	Nominated	
Dorian Awards	2017	Film Performance of the Year – Actress	Jackie	Nominated	
Empire Awards	2010	Best Actress	Black Swan	Nominated	
Empire Awards	2017	Best Actress	Jackie	Nominated	
Environmental Media Awards	2017	EMA Board of Directors Ongoing Commitment Award	—	Honored	
Fangoria Chainsaw Awards	2011	Best Actress	Black Swan	Won	
Florida Film Critics Circle Awards	2010	Best Actress	Black Swan	Won	
Florida Film Critics Circle Awards	2016	Best Actress	Jackie	Nominated	
Florida Film Critics Circle Awards	2018	Best Actress	Vox Lux	Nominated	
Florida Film Critics Circle Awards	2023	Best Actress	May December	Nominated	
Golden Raspberry Awards	2000	Worst Screen Couple (shared with Jake Lloyd)	Star Wars: Episode I – The Phantom Menace	Nominated	
Golden Raspberry Awards	2003	Worst Supporting Actress	Star Wars: Episode II – Attack of the Clones	Nominated	
Golden Raspberry Awards	2003	Worst Screen Couple (shared with Hayden Christensen)	Star Wars: Episode II – Attack of the Clones	Nominated	
Golden Raspberry Awards	2026	Worst Actress	Fountain of Youth	Nominated	
Gotham Awards	2016	Best Actress	Jackie	Nominated	
Gotham Awards	2009	Tribute Award	—	Won	
Georgia Film Critics Association	2016	Best Actress	Jackie	Won	
Hollywood Film Awards	2016	Actress of the Year	Jackie	Won	
Houston Film Critics Society Awards	2010	Best Actress	Black Swan	Won	
Houston Film Critics Society Awards	2017	Best Actress	Jackie	Won	
Independent Spirit Awards	2010	Best Female Lead	Black Swan	Won	
Independent Spirit Awards	2016	Best Female Lead	Jackie	Nominated	
Independent Spirit Awards	2023	Best Lead Performance	May December	Nominated	
IndieWire Critics Poll	2010	Best Lead Performance	Black Swan	3rd place	
IndieWire Critics Poll	2016	Best Lead Actress	Jackie	Runner-up	
International Cinephile Society	2005	Best Supporting Actress	Closer	Won	
International Cinephile Society	2011	Best Actress	Black Swan	Nominated	
International Cinephile Society	2017	Best Actress	Jackie	Nominated	
IFTA Film & Drama Awards	2005	Pantene Best International Actress	Garden State	Nominated	
IFTA Film & Drama Awards	2017	Best International Actress	Jackie	Nominated	
Israel Film Festival	2016	Achievement in Film Award	—	Honored	
Kids' Choice Awards	2023	Favorite Movie Actress	Thor: Love and Thunder	Nominated	
London Film Critics' Circle	2004	Actress of the Year	Closer	Nominated	
London Film Critics' Circle	2011	Actress of the Year	Black Swan	Nominated	
MTV Movie & TV Awards	2011	Best Female Performance	Black Swan	Nominated	
MTV Movie & TV Awards	2011	Best Kiss	Black Swan	Nominated	
MTV Movie & TV Awards	2011	Best Jaw Dropping Moment	Black Swan	Nominated	
National Board of Review	2004	Best Ensemble Cast	Closer	Won	
National Film Awards UK	2011	Performance of the Year	Black Swan	Nominated	
Online Film Critics Society Awards	2004	Best Supporting Actress	Closer	Nominated	
Online Film Critics Society Awards	2010	Best Lead Actress	Black Swan	Won	
Online Film Critics Society Awards	2016	Best Actress	Jackie	Won	
Palm Springs International Film Festival	2011	Desert Palm Achievement Award	Black Swan	Won	
Palm Springs International Film Festival	2017	Desert Palm Achievement Award	Jackie	Won	
People's Choice Awards	2012	Favorite Comedic Movie Actress	—	Nominated	
Russian National Movie Awards	2007	Best Foreign Actress	Paris, I love you, V for Vendetta	Nominated	
Russian National Movie Awards	2009	Best Foreign Actress	Hotel Chevalier / My Blueberry Nights and The Other Boleyn Girl	Nominated	
Russian National Movie Awards	2011	Best Foreign Actress	Brothers, Love and Other Impossible Pursuits	Won	
Russian National Movie Awards	2012	Best Foreign Actress of the Year	Black Swan, No Strings Attached, Thor, Your Highness	Won	
Russian National Movie Awards	2014	Best Foreign Actress of the Decade	—	Nominated	
Satellite Awards	2005	Best Supporting Actress in a Motion Picture	Closer	Nominated	
Satellite Awards	2005	Best Actress in a Motion Picture	Garden State	Nominated	
Satellite Awards	2010	Best Actress in a Motion Picture	Black Swan	Nominated	
Satellite Awards	2016	Best Actress in a Motion Picture	Jackie	Nominated	
Satellite Awards	2023	Best Actress – Motion Picture Drama	May December	Nominated	
Saturn Awards	2003	Best Actress in a Film	Star Wars: Episode II – Attack of the Clones	Nominated	
Saturn Awards	2006	Best Actress in a Film	V for Vendetta	Won	
Saturn Awards	2009	Best Actress in a Film	Brothers	Nominated	
Saturn Awards	2010	Best Actress in a Film	Black Swan	Won	
Saturn Awards	2021	Best Actress in a Film	Lucy in the Sky	Nominated	
San Diego Film Critics Society Awards	2010	Best Actress	Black Swan	Nominated	
San Diego Film Critics Society Awards	2016	Best Actress	Jackie	Nominated	
San Francisco Bay Area Film Critics Circle	2016	Best Actress	Jackie	Nominated	
Scream Awards	2006	Scream Queen	V for Vendetta	Nominated	
Scream Awards	2011	Best Fantasy Actress	Black Swan	Won	
Seattle Film Critics Society	2016	Best Actress	Jackie	Nominated	
St. Louis Gateway Film Critics Association Awards	2010	Best Actress	Black Swan	Won	
St. Louis Gateway Film Critics Association Awards	2016	Best Actress	Jackie	Nominated	
St. Louis Gateway Film Critics Association Awards	2023	Best Actress	May December	Nominated	
Teen Choice Awards	2000	Choice Movie Actress: Drama	Where the Heart Is	Nominated	
Teen Choice Awards	2002	Choice Movie Actress: Action	Star Wars: Episode II – Attack of the Clones	Nominated	
Teen Choice Awards	2002	Choice Movie: Chemistry (with Hayden Christensen)	Star Wars: Episode II – Attack of the Clones	Nominated	
Teen Choice Awards	2005	Choice Movie Actress: Action	Star Wars: Episode III – Revenge of the Sith	Nominated	
Teen Choice Awards	2005	Choice Movie Actress: Drama	Garden State	Nominated	
Teen Choice Awards	2005	Choice Movie: Liar	Garden State	Nominated	
Teen Choice Awards	2005	Choice Movie: Liplock (with Zach Braff)	Garden State	Nominated	
Teen Choice Awards	2005	Choice Movie: Love Scene (with Zach Braff)	Garden State	Nominated	
Teen Choice Awards	2011	Choice Movie Actress: Drama	Black Swan	Won	
Teen Choice Awards	2011	Choice Movie: Liplock (with Mila Kunis)	Black Swan	Nominated	
Teen Choice Awards	2011	Choice Movie Actress: Romantic Comedy	No Strings Attached	Nominated	
Teen Choice Awards	2014	Choice Movie Actress: Sci-Fi/Fantasy	Thor: The Dark World	Nominated	
Toronto Film Critics Association Awards	2010	Best Actress	Black Swan	Nominated	
Toronto Film Critics Association Awards	2016	Best Actress	Jackie	Runner-up	
Village Voice Film Poll	2010	Best Actress	Black Swan	Nominated	
Washington D.C. Area Film Critics Association	2010	Best Actress	Black Swan	Nominated	
Washington D.C. Area Film Critics Association	2016	Best Actress	Jackie	Won	
