= The Girl in the Book =

- Theatrical release poster
- Directed by: Marya Cohn
- Written by: Marya Cohn
- Produced by: Kyle Heller; Gina Resnick
- Starring: Emily VanCamp; Michael Nyqvist; David Call; Michael Cristofer; Talia Balsam; Ana Mulvoy-Ten
- Cinematography: Trevor Forrest
- Edited by: Jessica Brunetto
- Production companies: Varient; Busted Buggy Entertainment
- Distributed by: Myriad Pictures; Freestyle Releasing
- Release dates: June 13, 2015 (Los Angeles Film Festival); December 11, 2015 (United States)
- Running time: 86 minutes
- Country: United States
- Language: English
- Box office: $81.379

The Girl in the Book is a 2015 American drama film written and directed by Marya Cohn in her directorial debut. The film stars Emily VanCamp, Michael Nyqvist, David Call, Michael Cristofer, Talia Balsam and Ana Mulvoy-Ten. It had its world premiere at the Los Angeles Film Festival on June 13, 2015. The film was released in a limited release and through video on demand on December 11, 2015, by Myriad Pictures, and Freestyle Releasing. The Girl in the Book garnered a positive reception from critics who praised VanCamp's performance and Cohn's direction of her own script.

== Plot ==
Alice Harvey, a 28-year-old assistant book editor and aspiring writer, is tasked with handling the re-release of Milan Daneker's book Waking Eyes. Her father is a successful literary agent, who is overbearing, and her mother is overpowered by him. Alice first met Milan when she was 13, at one of her parents' parties. Soon after, Alice got stuck on a paper/potential novel she was writing and called Milan for guidance. Later, Alice's father was happy to find out Milan was mentoring her. He began to come over while she was home alone, and they lay on her bed. Milan asked Alice for a kiss and they started to make out.

In the present, she is forced by her boss, Jack, to interact with Milan again, and she has repeated flashbacks to their interactions. Her best friend, Sadie, throws Alice a surprise party for her 29th birthday where she meets Emmett Grant, a political activist whom she begins dating.

Alice finds herself feeling jarred and out of control as she works on the promotion for the re-release of Milan's book. She becomes distracted from her writing class and drops out when the teacher suggests she try again at another time. At work, Alice has been trying to get Jack to read a manuscript she really likes by author Karen Malone, but he continues to blow her off. Alice mentions the manuscript to her meddlesome father, and he offers to “fix it” by calling Jack. Alice makes him promise not to but, soon after, she's surprised when Karen comes in for a meeting with Jack. Alice is stunned to see her father bounding in, knowing he highjacked the find from her. Her father, Jack, and Karen go into a closed-door meeting, excluding Alice. Seeing them through a large picture window enrages her and, feeling betrayed, she storms out of the office.

Alice goes to Sadie's apartment, but she's at yoga. Her babysitter, Keith, is there and he notices she has a copy of “Waking Eyes” with her. He comments about disliking the book after being assigned to it read in a class. In the heat of the moment, Alice has sex with Keith, but Sadie comes home early and catches them and throws Alice out of her home. Feeling guilty, Alice ignores Emmett's phone calls. Alice watches an interview Milan is doing on TV, and the interviewer points out that none of his other books had been as successful as Waking Eyes. When asked why he thinks that is, Milan says that anyone can relate to being a teenager. Further, the interviewer asks how a man in his forties can perfectly capture the essence of a teenage girl. Milan appears caught off guard by the question. In a flashback with Alice, it becomes clear that he sexually exploited her and ripped off her writing for the book, but he lies and says it was complete fiction.

Alice ends up telling a suspicious Emmett the truth about her hookup with Keith, and he walks out on her. Dejected, with Emmett and Sadie not talking her, Alice goes to a bar and hooks up with a stranger. In a flashback, Alice tells Milan about a boy her own age that she had been seeing, and he lasciviously presses her for details about their hookup. Milan talks Alice into letting him be the first to make her have an orgasm. In the present, Alice wakes up crying in bed with her one-night stand and quickly leaves.

Alice goes to see Emmett and tries to explain her insecurities, saying that she enjoys the feeling of being wanted, but then begins to wonder why the guy can't do better than her. Emmett says that he does want her, but agrees that he could probably do better. Eventually, Alice and Sadie talk. Alice says she is going to work on her issues so they begin to mend their friendship. Previously, Emmett called out Alice for not trying to further her interest in writing. Desperate to win him back, she writes a blog post with a list of 100 reasons why he should give her another chance.

Back at work, when the re-release of Waking Eyes is hot off the presses, Alice sees that there is a new dedication written about her. In the past, at a book signing, Milan began to read aloud, and Alice finally realized he had blatantly stolen her work, in some cases verbatim, and incorporates details from the sexual relationship he manipulated her into. Alice finally gets the courage to tell her mother what happened. On the car ride home with her parents after the book signing, Alice is mortified when her father mentions that her mother told him her secret. He says that he asked Milan about it, who denied it. They tell her she may have misinterpreted her interaction with Milan, or she may just have a crush on him. In the present day, Alice goes to confront Milan but he still denies any wrongdoing.

Elsewhere, Emmett finds the blog post. He's touched and after Alice comes to his apartment they get back together. At the re-release party of the book, Alice does not show up, staying with Emmett instead. He asks her if she's the girl in the book, to which she replies, "not anymore".

== Cast ==
- Emily VanCamp as Alice Harvey
  - Ana Mulvoy-Ten as Young Alice
- Michael Nyqvist as Milan Daneker
- David Call as Emmett Grant
- Michael Cristofer as Dad
- Talia Balsam as Mom
- Ali Ahn as Sadie
- Mason Yam as Tyler
- Courtney Daniels as Lynn
- Jordan Lage as Jack

== Production ==
In June 2013, it was announced Emily VanCamp, and Michael Nyqvist had joined the cast of the film, with Marya Cohn making her directorial debut. Production on the film began in mid-June of that same year, in New York City. It was filmed during a five-week gap VanCamp had between seasons on Revenge.

== Post-production ==
A Kickstarter campaign was set up to raise money for post-production, the goal was set at $65,000, the goal was met raising a total of $65,342. Rewards for donating included a behind-the scenes blog, and a coffee table book.

== Release ==
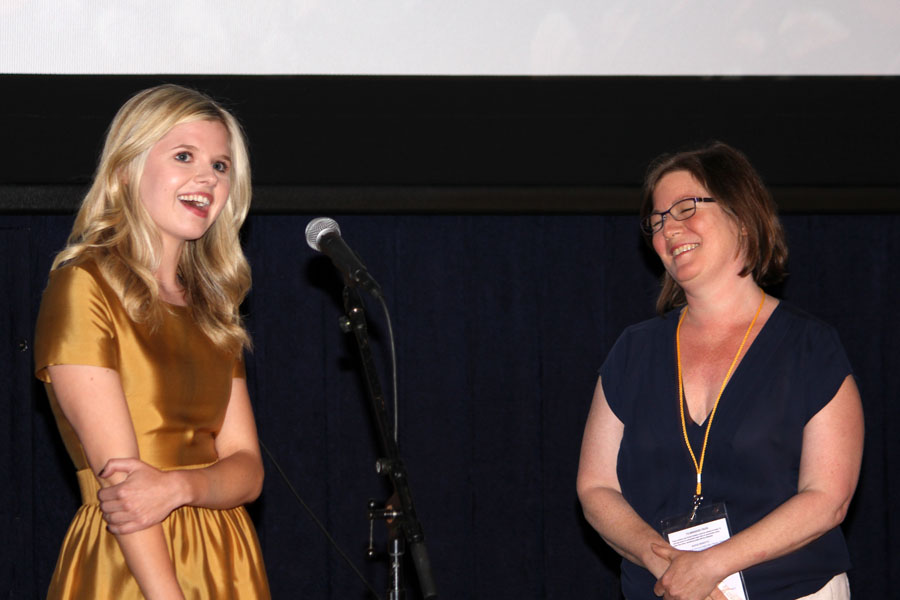
Ana Mulvoy-Ten and Marya Cohn during a presentation for The Girl in the Book at the 2015 Los Angeles Film Festival

The film had its world premiere at the Los Angeles Film Festival on June 13, 2015. Its Box Office Opening Weekend United States (and Gross) was a mere US$5,249, dated 13 Dec 2015. In October 2015, it was announced Myriad Pictures, and Freestyle Releasing acquired U.S distribution rights to the film. The film was released in a limited release and through video on demand on December 11, 2015.

== Reception ==
=== Box office ===
The Girl in the Book has grossed $8,245 in the United States and Canada, and $73,134 in other territories, for a total worldwide gross of $81,379, plus $46,656 with home video sales.

=== Critical response ===
Despite finding minor complaints with the film's ending being too resolute, Sara Stewart of the New York Post called it "a smart and pointed look at abuses of power and roles women too often play in the literary world." Andy Webster of The New York Times gave praise to both Mulvoy-Ten and VanCamp for their portrayal of Alice, calling the latter's performance of the adult version "a rounded, winning blend of self-doubt and fitful initiative." Stewart also found Cohn's handling of the film's final act too neat but was optimistic about her potential as a filmmaker, concluding that, "Given her confident hand behind the camera and gift for rich female characters, you hope to see more portraits from her in the future." Stephanie Merry of The Washington Post was also positive towards VanCamp's performance as being "exceptional, eliciting our sympathy even when the character is making maddeningly self-destructive decisions." Merry called Cohn's handling of the story's twists and dialogue "a quietly devastating portrait of innocence lost too soon and adulthood delayed too long." Conversely, Michael Rechtshaffen of the Los Angeles Times found Cohn's semi-autobiographical tale "dramatically ponderous" with its standard emotional storyline beats and characters that are just believable enough, concluding that "As a screen proposition, The Girl in the Book is ultimately unable to extricate itself from those written confines."

== See also ==
- List of directorial debuts § 2015
- Statutory rape
