= Nickelodeon UK Kids' Choice Awards 2012 =

British entertainment awards ceremony

2012 UK Kids Choice Awards
- Date: April 1, 2012
- Hosted by: Will Smith
- Website: http://kca.nick.co.uk

Television/radio coverage
- Network: Nickelodeon UK

The 2012 UK Kids Choice Awards took place on 1 April 2012 at 5:30PM. The show followed a similar format as the one in the United States, with seven unique categories for the UK. Voting started on February 20, 2012. Kids Choice Awards 2012 was viewed by 201,000 people.

== Promotional Material ==
New promos were released early for the 2012 Kids' Choice Awards in the UK, with the first on January 20, 2012 during a new episode of Supah Ninjas. Some included scenes with Big Time Rush and the cast of Victorious explaining how to vote. There was also a promo with Will Smith (this year's host) entering the "Kids' Choice Headquarters". The UK edition included the UK band One Direction talking to Smith. Promos used the same layout and style as Nick in the US. All promotional material was voiced by Peter Dickson, also known as Voiceover Man.

== UK Categories ==
This year the Nickelodeon UK Kids' Choice Awards had 7 unique categories this year, 5 more than previous years. Below is a list of UK categories and their nominees. Bold text represents the winner.

Favourite UK Band

- **One Direction**
- The Wanted
- Little Mix
- JLS

Favourite UK Female Artist

- Jessie J
- **Adele**
- Pixie Lott
- Cher Lloyd

Favourite UK Male Artist

- **Olly Murs**
- Tinie Tempah
- Ed Sheeran
- Professor Green

Favourite UK TV Show

- House of Anubis (Nickelodeon)
- **X Factor** (ITV)
- Doctor Who (BBC One)
- Tracy Beaker Returns (CBBC)

Favourite UK Newcomer

- Little Mix
- Cher Lloyd
- Tulisa
- **One Direction**

Favourite UK Actor

- Brad Kavanagh
- **Robert Pattinson**
- Daniel Radcliffe
- Matt Smith

Favourite UK Actress

- **Emma Watson**
- Karen Gillan
- Ana Mulvoy Ten
- Pixie Lott (in Fred: The Movie)
