= Ana Mulvoy-Ten =

British actress

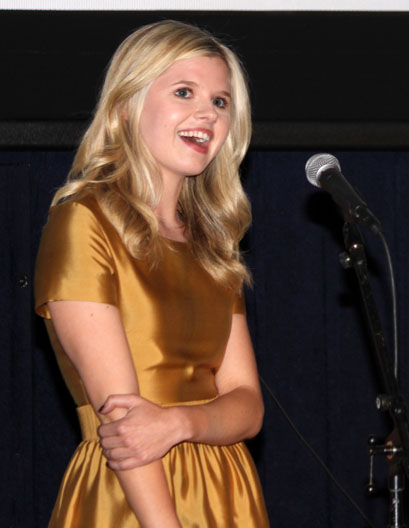
- Mulvoy-Ten in 2015
- Born: Ana Maria Mulvoy-Ten; 8 May 1992 (age 34); Croydon, London, England
- Occupation: Actress
- Years active: 2002–present

Ana Maria Mulvoy-Ten (born 8 May 1992) is an English actress. She is known for playing the character of Amber Millington on the British boarding school drama House of Anubis.

== Early life ==
Mulvoy-Ten was born in England to an Irish father and Spanish mother and is a dual national. Mulvoy Ten was raised bilingual. She attended a British school.

== Career ==
Mulvoy-Ten's first role was as an extra in Harry Potter and the Chamber of Secrets. In 2008 she was cast in her first starring role as Rosi in Cosas de la vida.

Mulvoy-Ten's first break out role was in the Nickelodeon show House of Anubis as Amber Millington. She went on to star in 2015's The Girl in the Book, where she received praise by critics such as Andy Webster of The New York Times for her portrayal of young Alice. In 2017 she was announced to join the cast of American Crime as trafficked teenage sex worker Shae Reese.

She has been a model for photographer Tyler Shields in multiple shoots.

== Personal life ==
Mulvoy-Ten was born in London, but grew up between Spain and England. She was raised bilingually. She attended the all girls private school Pipers Corner School in England.

== Filmography ==
Film roles
| Year | Title | Role | Notes | Refs. |
|---|---|---|---|---|
| 2002 | Harry Potter and the Chamber of Secrets | Student | | |
| 2003 | My House in Umbria | | Uncredited | |
| 2012 | First Time Loser | Leila | | |
| 2015 | The Girl in the Book | Young Alice | | |
| 2016 | Tomato Soup | Baldwin | | |
| 2016 | Outlaw | Jen | | |
| 2016 | The Queen of Hollywood Blvd. | Grace | | |
| 2016 | Ascension | Angela | | |
| 2017 | Tuer Les Fleurs | Lydia | | |
| 2018 | Best Baddies | Blyth | Short film | |
| 2018 | Ascension | Angela | | |
| 2019 | Selah and the Spades | Bobby | | |
| 2024 | Push | Sarah | | |
| TBA | Crossed | Sheena | Post-production | |

Television roles
| Year | Title | Role | Notes | Refs. |
|---|---|---|---|---|
| 2003 | Star | Anniee | Episode: "The Curse of Bradley" | |
| 2009 | Myths | Aphrodite | Episode: "Paris and the Goddesses" | |
| 2008–2010 | Cosas de la vida | Rosi | Main role; 27 Episodes | |
| 2011 | Red Faction: Origins | Vayla | TV movie | |
| 2011–2013 | House of Anubis | Amber Millington | Main role; 160 Episodes | |
| 2011–2013 | Anubis Unlocked | Herself | | |
| 2012 | Figure It Out | Herself | Episode 2.8 | |
| 2014 | Teen Wolf | Carrie Hudson | Episode: "I.E.D. " | |
| 2015 | CSI: Cyber | Jennifer Mayfield | Episode: "URL, Interrupted" | |
| 2015 | Vanity | Karen | Recurring role; 7 episodes | |
| 2015 | Ur in Analysis | Daisy | TV movie | |
| 2017 | American Crime | Shae Reese | Recurring role (season 3) | |
| 2017 | Famous in Love | Dakota | Episode: Pilot | |
| 2024 | The Old Man | Anna Rollins | Episode: "XIII" | |

== Awards and nominations ==
| Year | Award | Category | Recipient | Result | Ref. |
|---|---|---|---|---|---|
| 2012 | Nickelodeon UK Kids' Choice Awards | Favourite UK Actress | House of Anubis | Nominated | |
