= Marya Cohn =

American screenwriter and director

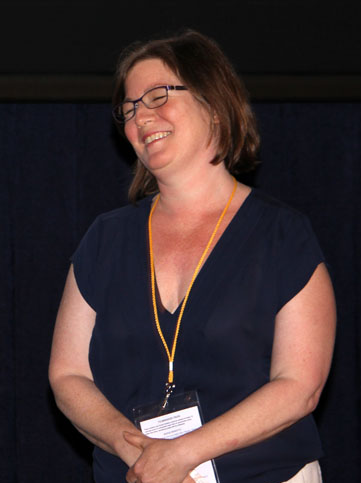
- Cohn during a presentation of The Girl in the Book
- Spouse: Tjebbo Penning
- Writing career
- Genre: screenwriter
- Notable work: The Girl in the Book

Marya Cohn is an American screenwriter and director.

== Biography ==
In 1994, Cohn directed the student short film Developing. The film starred a then unknown Natalie Portman in her first film role.

In 2013, Cohn began filming her feature film debut, The Girl in the Book starring Emily Vancamp in a semi-autobiographical film about a young book editor who is forced to work with a man who abused her as a teenager. Post-production for the film was completed via kickstarter The film premiered at the 2015 Los Angeles Film Festival. It was acquired by Myriad Pictures and given a limited release in December 2015.

Cohn is the daughter of talent agent Sam Cohn. She is of partially Jewish descent.

In 1994, she married director Fraser Bresnahan.

In 2001, she married Dutch director Tjebbo Penning.

== Filmography ==
- Developing (1994)
- The Girl in the Book (2015)
