= Natalie Portman =

Israeli and American actress (born 1981)

- נטלי פורטמן
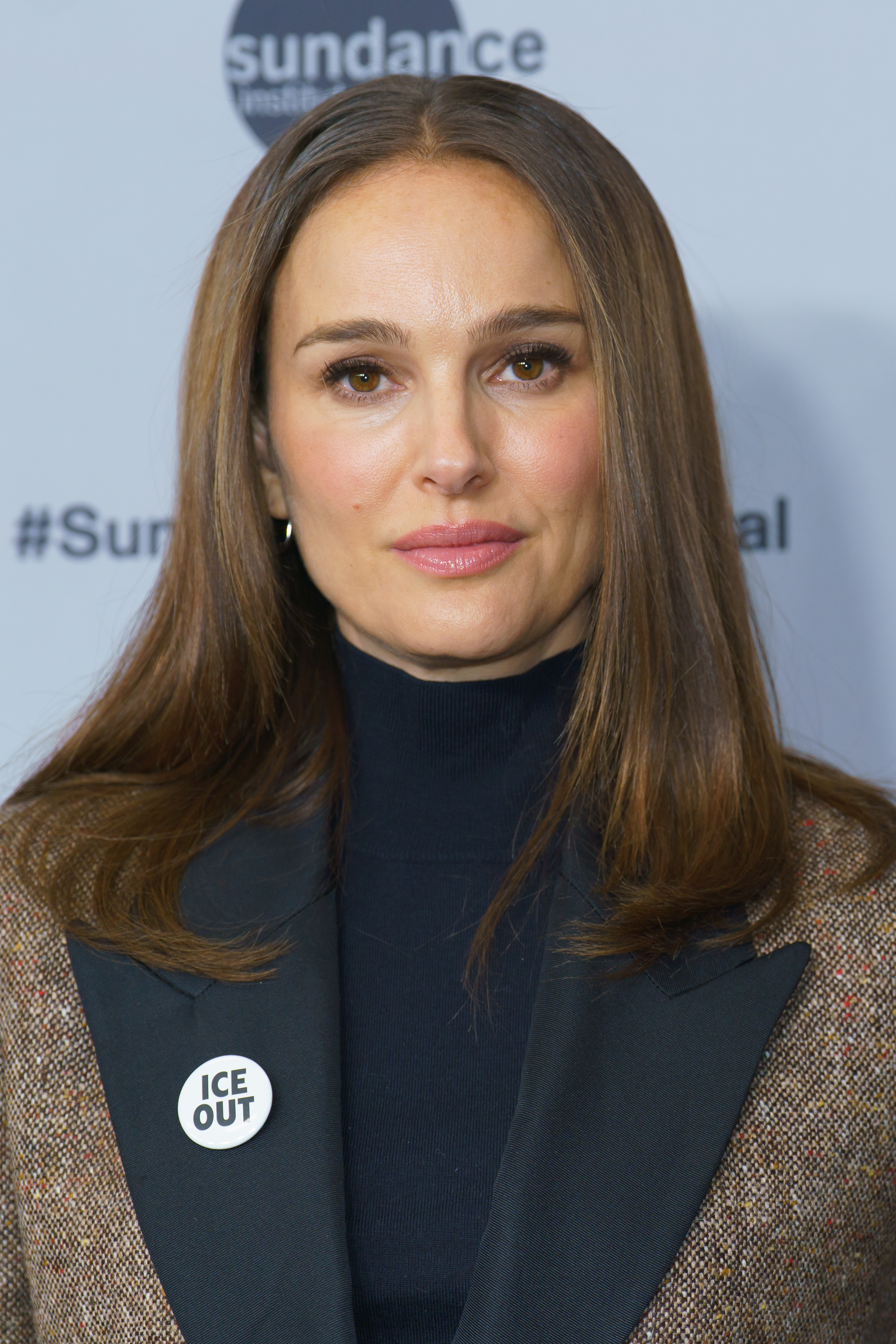
- Portman in 2026
- Born: Natalie Hershlag; June 9, 1981 (age 45); Mount Scopus, Jerusalem, Israel
- Citizenship: Israel; United States
- Education: Harvard University (AB)
- Occupations: Actress; director; producer
- Years active: 1993–present
- Works: Full list
- Spouse: Benjamin Millepied (m. 2012; div. 2024)
- Partner: Tanguy Destable (2025–present)
- Children: 3
- Awards: Full list

Natalie Hershlag (Note: Some Hebrew sources claim that her birth name was "Neta-Lee Hershleg" (Hebrew: נטע-לי הרשלג) and later, her first name was Americanized to "Natalie". However, Portman has stated that her name has always been Natalie.) (born June 9, 1981), known professionally as Natalie Portman, is an actress and filmmaker with dual Israeli and American citizenship. She has had a screen career from her teenage years and has starred in various blockbusters and independent films. Her accolades include an Academy Award, a BAFTA Award, and two Golden Globe Awards.

Portman was born in Jerusalem and moved to the United States when she was three. She began her acting career at age 13, starring as the protégée of a hitman in Léon: The Professional (1994). While in high school, she made her Broadway debut in The Diary of Anne Frank (1997) and gained international recognition for her role as Padmé Amidala in Star Wars: Episode I – The Phantom Menace (1999). From 1999 to 2003, Portman attended Harvard University, earning a bachelor's degree in psychology. During this time, she appeared in the next two films of the Star Wars prequel trilogy (2002 and 2005) and performed in a 2001 revival of Anton Chekhov's The Seagull at The Public Theater.

Portman's career gained further momentum in 2004 when she won a Golden Globe and received an Academy Award nomination for Best Supporting Actress for Closer. She then played Evey Hammond in V for Vendetta (2005), Anne Boleyn in The Other Boleyn Girl (2008), and a troubled ballerina in Black Swan (2010), for which she won the Academy Award for Best Actress. In the following years, Portman starred in the romantic comedy No Strings Attached (2011) and portrayed Jacqueline Kennedy in Jackie (2016), which earned her a third Academy Award nomination. She played Jane Foster in the Marvel Cinematic Universe films Thor (2011), Thor: The Dark World (2013), and Thor: Love and Thunder (2022), which established her as one of the world's highest-paid actresses.

Portman directed the short film Eve (2008) and the biographical drama A Tale of Love and Darkness (2015), in which she also starred. In 2021, she co-founded the production company MountainA, which produced the film May December (2023) and the miniseries Lady in the Lake (2024); Portman also starred in both productions. Portman is an advocate for various causes, including women's rights, environmental issues, and animal welfare, and supports organizations such as the Human Rights Foundation and the Jane Goodall Institute.

== Early life ==
Natalie Hershlag was born on June 9, 1981, in Mount Scopus, Jerusalem at Hadassah Medical Center to Jewish parents. She is the only child of Shelley Stevens, an Ohio-born artist, and Avner Hershlag, an Israeli-born gynecologist. Portman's maternal grandparents were Jewish immigrants from Russia and Austria who settled in the United States, while her paternal grandparents emigrated from Poland to the land of Israel/Palestine in the late 1930s. Her grandfather had led a Jewish youth movement in Poland and went to Palestine expecting to send for his family later, but they were killed in the gas chambers of Auschwitz. Her paternal grandmother, originally from Romania, worked as a spy for the British during World War II. Portman is a dual citizen of Israel and the United States, (Note: Attributed to multiple references:) and her first language is Hebrew. Her stage surname Portman comes from her maternal grandmother's maiden name.

Portman and her family immigrated to the United States around 1984, when Portman was three. They initially lived in Washington, D.C., relocating to Connecticut in 1988 and then settling in Syosset, Long Island. While living in Washington, Portman attended Charles E. Smith Jewish Day School in Rockville, Maryland. On Long Island, she attended a Jewish elementary school, the Solomon Schechter Day School of Nassau County. She studied ballet and modern dance at the American Theater Dance Workshop, and regularly attended the Usdan Center for the Creative and Performing Arts. Portman has said that as a child she was more ambitious than her peers. She added, "I knew what I liked and what I wanted, and I worked very hard. I was a very serious kid".

When Portman was ten years old, a Revlon agent spotted her at a restaurant and asked her to become a model. She turned down the offer but used the opportunity to get an acting agent. She auditioned for the 1992 off-Broadway musical Ruthless!, which tells the story of a girl who is prepared to commit murder to get the lead role in a school play. Portman and Britney Spears were chosen as understudies for the play's star Laura Bell Bundy.

== Career ==
=== 1994–1998: Early work ===
Six months after Ruthless! ended, Portman auditioned for and secured a leading role in Luc Besson's action drama Léon: The Professional (1994). She adopted her paternal grandmother's maiden name, Portman, as her stage name. (Note: Attributed to multiple references:) She played Mathilda, an orphaned child who befriends a middle-aged hitman (played by Jean Reno). Her parents were reluctant to let the 13-year-old Portman play the role due to the explicit sexuality and violence in the script, but agreed to it after Besson removed Mathilda's nudity and the killings she committed. (Note: Attributed to multiple references:) When the film was complete, Portman's mother was displeased that it contained "sexual twists and turns" which were not in the script. In a 2023 interview, Portman described some aspects of the film as "cringey", and said her relationship to it is "complicated". Hal Hinson of The Washington Post commended Portman for bringing a "genuine sense of tragedy" to her part, while Peter Rainer of the Los Angeles Times believed that she was not "enough of an actress to unfold Mathilda's pain" and criticized Besson's sexualization of her character.

"[T]here's a surprising preponderance of that kind of role for young girls. Sort of being fantasy objects for men, and especially this idealised purity combined with the fertility of youth, and all this in one. ... It was definitely interesting to think about – why men write the female characters they do. Just like the way they write the male character. How much is wish-fulfilment fantasy, and why."

— Portman on playing sexualized youngsters as a child, 2007

After filming The Professional, Portman went back to school and during the summer break of 1994, she filmed a part in Marya Cohn's short film Developing. In it she played a young girl coping with her mother's (played by Frances Conroy) cancer. She also enrolled at the Stagedoor Manor performing arts camp, where she played Anne Shirley in a staging of Anne of Green Gables. Michael Mann offered her the small part of the suicidal stepdaughter of Al Pacino's character in the action film Heat (1995) for her ability to portray dysfunction without hysteria. Impressed by her performance in The Professional, the director Ted Demme cast her as a precocious teenager who flirts with her much-older neighbor (played by Timothy Hutton) in the ensemble comedy-drama Beautiful Girls (1996). Janet Maslin of The New York Times wrote, "Portman, a budding knockout, is scene-stealingly good even in an overly showy role." She subsequently went back to Stagedoor Manor to appear in a production of the musical Cabaret. Also in 1996, Portman had brief roles in Woody Allen's musical Everyone Says I Love You and Tim Burton's comic science fiction film Mars Attacks!.

Portman was cast opposite Leonardo DiCaprio in Baz Luhrmann's Romeo + Juliet (1996), but she dropped out during rehearsals when studio executives found her too young for the role. Luhrmann said "Natalie was amazing in the footage, but it was too much of a burden for her at that age". She was also offered Adrian Lyne's Lolita, based on the novel of the same name, but she turned down the part due to its excessive sexual content. She later bemoaned that her parts in The Professional and Beautiful Girls prompted a series of offers to play a sexualized youngster, adding that it "dictated a lot of my choices afterwards 'cos it scared me ... it made me reluctant to do sexy stuff".

Portman instead signed on to star as Anne Frank in a Broadway revival of The Diary of Anne Frank, which was staged at the Music Box Theatre from December 1997 to May 1998. In preparation, she twice visited the Anne Frank House in Amsterdam and interacted with Miep Gies, who had preserved Anne's diary after the family was captured; she found a connection with Frank's story, given her own family's history with the Holocaust. Reviewing the production for Variety, Greg Evans disliked her portrayal, which he thought had "little of the charm, budding genius or even brittle intelligence that the diary itself reveals". Conversely, Ben Brantley found an "ineffable grace in her awkwardness". The experience of performing the play was emotionally draining for her, as she attended high school during the day and performed at night; she wrote personal essays in Time and Seventeen magazines about her experience.

=== 1999–2006: Star Wars, education, and transition to mature roles ===
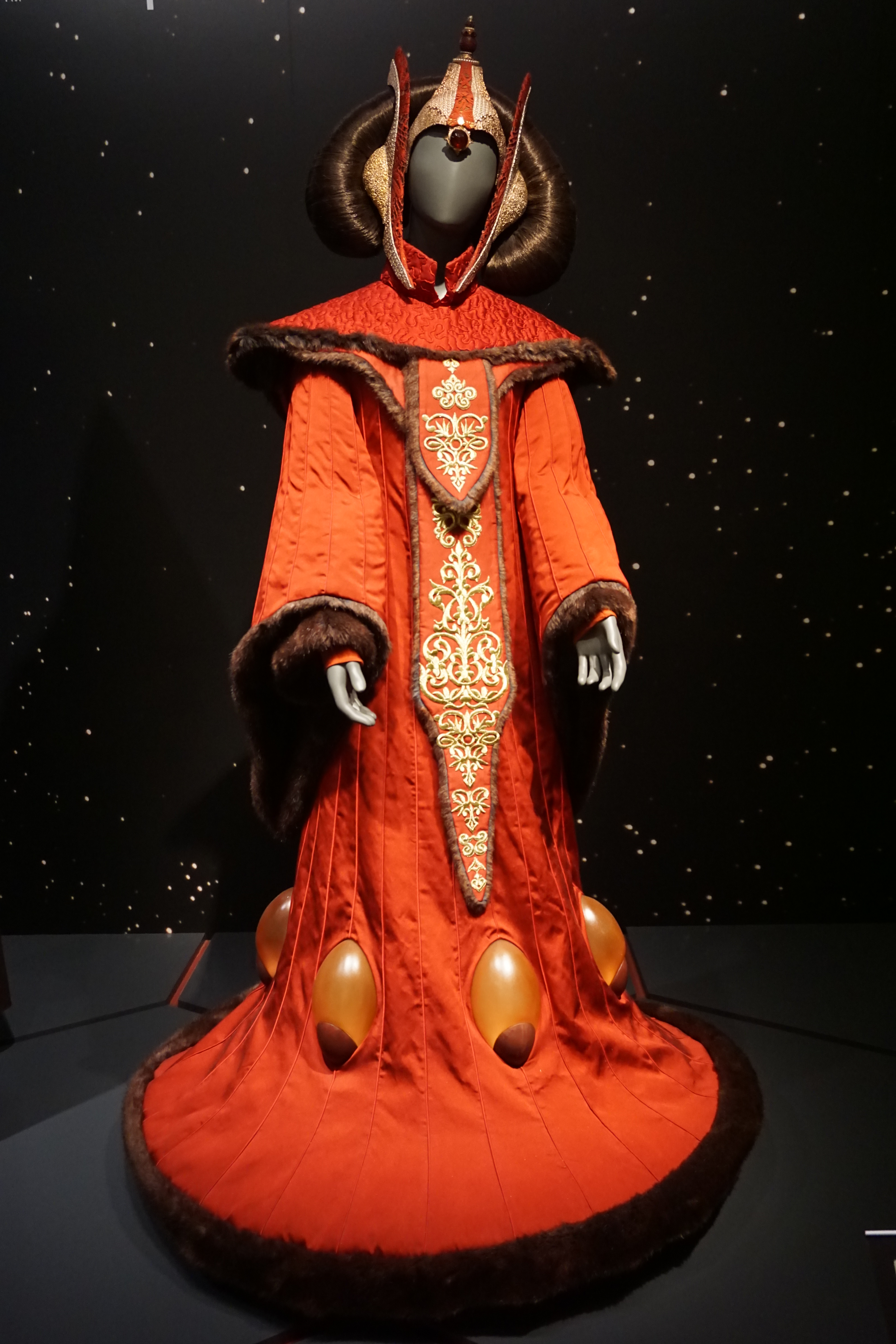
Portman's Padmé Amidala costume from Star Wars: Episode I – The Phantom Menace (1999) on display at the Detroit Institute of Arts

Portman began filming the part of Padmé Amidala in the Star Wars prequel trilogy in 1997, which marked her first big-budget production. The first film of the series, Episode I – The Phantom Menace was released in 1999, when she was in her senior year of high school. Portman was unfamiliar with the franchise when she was cast, and watched the original Star Wars trilogy before filming began. She worked closely with the director George Lucas on her character's accent and mannerisms, and watched the films of Lauren Bacall, Audrey Hepburn, and Katharine Hepburn to draw inspiration from their voice and stature. Filming in arduous locations in Algeria proved challenging for Portman. She did not attend the film's premiere so she could study for her high school finals. The critical response to the film was mixed, but with earnings of $924 million worldwide it was the second highest-grossing film of all time to that point, and it established Portman as a global star.

Portman graduated from Syosset High School in 1999. Her high school paper, "A Simple Method to Demonstrate the Enzymatic Production of Hydrogen from Sugar", co-authored with scientists Ian Hurley and Jonathan Woodward, was entered in the Intel Science Talent Search. Following production on The Phantom Menace, Portman initially turned down a lead role in the coming-of-age film Anywhere but Here (1999) after learning it would involve a sex scene, but the director Wayne Wang and actress Susan Sarandon (who played Portman's mother in the film) demanded a rewrite of the script. She was shown a new draft, and decided to accept the part. Mary Elizabeth Williams of Salon called Portman's performance "astonishing" and added that "unlike any number of actresses her age, she's neither too maudlin nor too plucky". She received a Golden Globe Award for Best Supporting Actress nomination for it.

Portman's sole screen appearance in 2000 was in Where the Heart Is, a romantic drama filmed in Texas, in which she played a pregnant teenager. After finishing work on the film, she began attending Harvard University to pursue her bachelor's degree in psychology, and significantly reduced her acting roles over the next few years. At Harvard she served as Alan Dershowitz's research assistant for his book The Case for Israel. Both spoke highly of each other and described themselves as close friends, with Dershowitz calling her a "terrific student." She then studied advanced Hebrew literature and neurobiology, In the summer of 2001, she returned to Broadway (at the Delacorte Theater) to perform Chekhov's drama The Seagull, which was directed by Mike Nichols and co-starred Meryl Streep and Philip Seymour Hoffman. Linda Winer of Newsday wrote that the "major surprises come from Portman, whose Nina transforms with astonishing lyricism from the girl with ambition to Chekhov's most difficult symbol of destruction". Also in 2001, Portman was among several celebrities who made cameo appearances in the comedy Zoolander. The following year she reprised her role of Amidala in Star Wars: Episode II – Attack of the Clones, which she had filmed in Sydney and London during her summer break of 2000. She was excited by the opportunity to play a confident young woman who did not depend on the male lead. When asked about balancing her career and education, she said, "I don't care if [college] ruins my career. I'd rather be smart than a movie star." In 2002, she contributed to a study on memory called "Frontal lobe activation during object permanence: data from near-infrared spectroscopy". Portman graduated from Harvard in 2003 and her sole screen appearance that year was in the brief part of a young mother in the war film Cold Mountain. She described this period as the "most difficult time" in her life, noting that she wasn't getting work and felt criticized for her performances in Star Wars. After taking time off, she begged for the Cold Mountain role, which Mike Nichols helped secure, offering her a letter of support that helped her regain confidence.

Portman began 2004 by featuring in the romantic comedy Garden State, which was written and directed by its star Zach Braff. She was the first actor to sign on to the film after finding a connection with her part: a spirited young girl suffering from epilepsy. Her role in it was described by Nathan Rabin of The A.V. Club. as a prime example of the Manic Pixie Dream Girl character type – a stereotypical female role designed to spiritually help a male protagonist. Portman later said she found it upsetting to have contributed to the trope. She followed it by playing a mysterious stripper in Closer, a romantic drama directed by Mike Nichols based on the play of the same name, and co-starring Julia Roberts, Jude Law, and Clive Owen. Portman agreed to her first sexually explicit adult role after turning down such parts in the past, saying it reflected her own maturity as a person. She had also performed her first nude scenes for the film, but they were deleted from the final cut when she insisted that they were inessential to the story. Closer grossed over $115 million worldwide against a $27 million budget, and the critic Peter Travers took note of Portman's "blazing, breakthrough performance", writing that she "digs so deep into the bruised core of her character that they seem to wear the same skin." She won the Golden Globe for Best Supporting Actress and received an Academy Award nomination in the same category.

Star Wars: Episode III – Revenge of the Sith, the final installment of the Star Wars prequel trilogy, was Portman's first film release of 2005. It earned over $848 million to rank as the second-highest-grossing film of the year. She next played a Jewish American girl in Free Zone (2005), a drama from Israeli filmmaker Amos Gitai. During the project, which was shot in Israel—particularly in the spring of 2004—she spent six months taking graduate courses at the Hebrew University of Jerusalem, studying subjects such as the anthropology of violence and Middle Eastern studies. In 2005, she read the memoirs of Yitzhak Rabin and a novel by David Grossman, which she said helped her explore both the role and her own heritage, and remarked that, "living in Israel is really beautiful. One of the most shocking things is how peaceful it feels." Critics disliked the film for its heavy-handed approach to the conflicts in the Middle East.

Portman's final film role in 2005 was that of Evey Hammond in the political thriller V for Vendetta, based on the comics of the same name, about an alternative future where a neo-fascist regime has subjugated the United Kingdom. She was drawn to the provocative nature of the script, and worked with a dialect coach to speak in an English accent. In a scene in which her character is tortured, her head was shaved on camera; she considered it an opportunity to rid herself of vanity. Ruthe Stein of the San Francisco Chronicle deemed it Portman's strongest performance to that point, and remarked that she "keeps you focused on her words and actions instead of her bald head." She was awarded the Saturn Award for Best Actress.

Portman began 2006 by hosting an episode of the television sketch comedy show Saturday Night Live. One of her sketches, a song named "Natalie's Rap", was released later in 2009 on Incredibad, an album by the Lonely Island. In the anthology film Paris, je t'aime, consisting of eighteen short films, she had a role in the segment named "Faubourg Saint-Denis" from director Tom Tykwer. Later that year, she starred in Miloš Forman's Goya's Ghosts, about the painter Francisco Goya. Forman cast her in the film after finding a resemblance between her and Goya's portrait The Milkmaid of Bordeaux. She insisted on using a body double for her nude scenes after discovering on set that she had to perform them when they were not originally in the script. It received predominantly negative reviews, but Roger Ebert was appreciative of Portman for playing her dual role "with fearless conviction".

=== 2007–2015: Career expansion and Black Swan ===
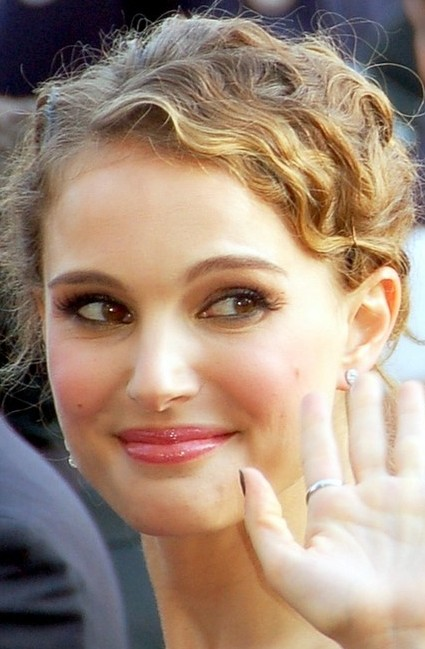
Portman at the 2008 Cannes Film Festival, where she served as a jury member

Portman began 2007 by replacing Jodie Foster in Wong Kar-wai's romantic drama My Blueberry Nights, which was his first English-language film. For her role as a gambler, she trained with a poker coach. Richard Corliss of Time magazine believed that "for once she's not playing a waif or a child princess but a mature, full-bodied woman" and commended her "vibrancy, grittiness and ache, all performed with a virtuosa's easy assurance". Her next appearance was in Hotel Chevalier, a short film from Wes Anderson, which served as a prolog to his feature The Darjeeling Limited (in which Portman had a cameo). In the short, she and Jason Schwartzman play former lovers who reunite in a Paris hotel room. For the first time, Portman performed an extended nude scene; she was later disappointed at the undue focus on it and she subsequently swore off appearing nude again. Keen to work in different genres, Portman accepted a role in the children's film Mr. Magorium's Wonder Emporium, playing an employee of a magical toy store. She also appeared in Paul McCartney's music video "Dance Tonight" from his album Memory Almost Full, directed by Michel Gondry.

Scarlett Johansson and Portman portrayed rival sisters Mary and Anne Boleyn, respectively, in the period film The Other Boleyn Girl (2008). She was excited by the opportunity to work opposite another actress her age, bemoaning that such casting was rare in film. The film had modest box-office earnings. Derek Elley of Variety was critical of Portman's English accent and wrote that she "doesn't quite bring the necessary heft to make Anne a truly dominant power player". She served as a jury member of the 2008 Cannes Film Festival and also launched her own production company, named handsomecharlie films, after her late dog. Portman's directorial debut, the short film Eve, opened the short-film screenings at the 65th Venice International Film Festival. It is about a young woman who goes to her grandmother's romantic date, and Portman drew inspiration for the older character (played by Lauren Bacall) from her own grandmother.

A poorly received adaptation of Ayelet Waldman's novel Love and Other Impossible Pursuits, entitled The Other Woman, marked Portman's first film role of 2009. She appeared in a faux perfume commercial called Greed, directed by Roman Polanski, and in the anthology film New York, I Love You, she directed a segment and also starred in a different segment directed by Mira Nair. Portman next took on a role opposite Tobey Maguire and Jake Gyllenhaal in the drama film Brothers, a remake of the 2004 Danish film of the same name. Her role was that of a war widow, for which she spoke with military wives to prepare. The film was shot during the 2007–08 Writers Guild of America strike, and Portman found it challenging to shoot certain scenes without a written script. Claudia Puig of USA Today found her to be "subdued and reactive in a part that doesn't call for her to do much else".

After producing and co-starring alongside Joseph Gordon-Levitt in the black comedy Hesher (2010), Portman played a ballerina overwhelmed with the prospect of performing Swan Lake in Darren Aronofsky's psychological horror film Black Swan. She was trained by the professional ballerina Mary Helen Bowers, and in preparation, she trained for five to eight hours daily for six months and lost 20 pounds (9 kilograms). Her performance was acclaimed; writing for Empire, Dan Jolin found her to be "simultaneously at her most vulnerable and her most predatory, at once frostily brittle and raunchily malleable [...] before peaking at the film's denouement with a raw, alluring showstopper of a performance." Black Swan emerged as a sleeper hit, grossing over $329 million worldwide against a $13 million budget, and earned Portman several awards, including the Academy Award for Best Actress. Following her Oscar win, controversy arose over who performed the bulk of the on-screen dancing in the film. Sarah Lane, one of Portman's dance doubles in the film, claimed that the actress performed only about five percent of the full-body shots, adding that she was asked by the film's producers not to speak publicly about it during awards season. Aronofsky defended Portman by insisting that she had performed 80 percent of the on-screen dancing.

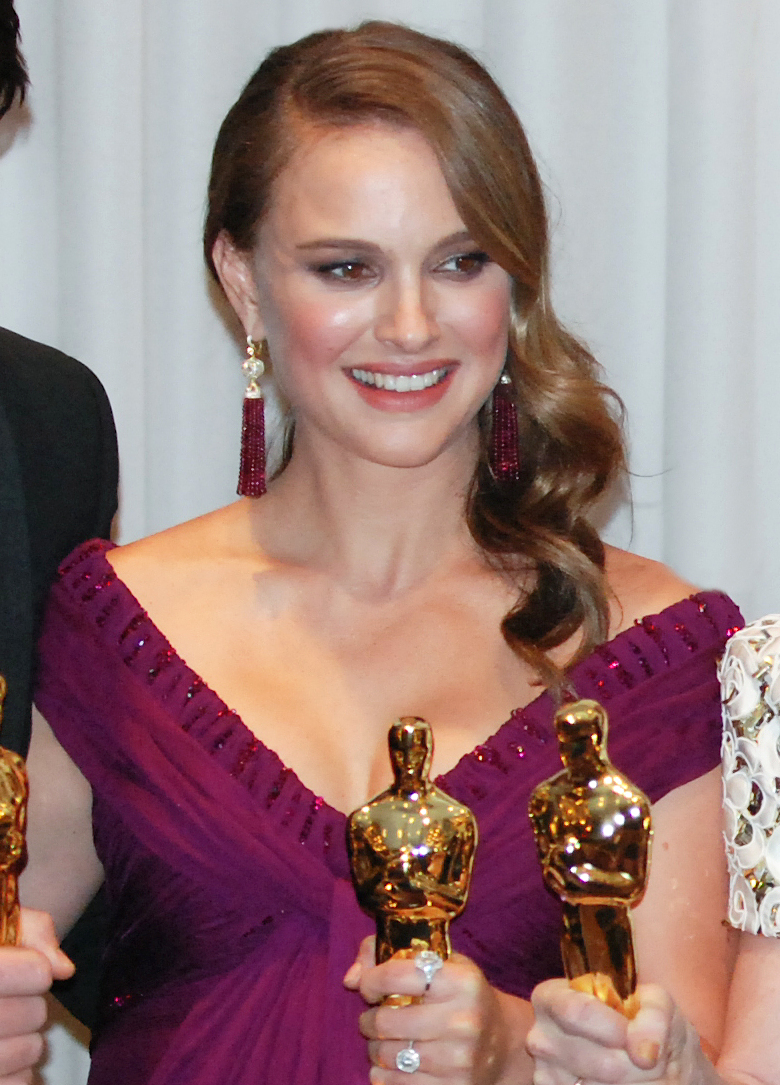
Portman at the 83rd Academy Awards in 2011, where she won the Academy Award for Best Actress

Portman next served as an executive producer for No Strings Attached (2011), a romantic comedy in which she starred with Ashton Kutcher as a young couple in a casual sex relationship. She described the experience of making it as a "palate cleanser" from the intensity of Black Swan. It received unfavorable reviews but was a commercial success. She next agreed to the film Your Highness for the opportunity of playing an athletic and foul-mouthed character, which she believed was rare for actresses. Critics were dismissive of the film's reliance on scatological humor and it proved to be a box-office bomb. In her final film release of 2011, Portman took on the part of Jane Foster, a scientist and love-interest of the titular character (played by Chris Hemsworth) in the Marvel Cinematic Universe superhero film Thor. She liked the idea of Kenneth Branagh directing a big-budget film that emphasized character; she signed on to it before receiving a script, and helped develop her part by reading the biography of scientists such as Rosalind Franklin. Richard Kuipers of Variety commended Portman's "sterling work in a thinly written role" for adding dimension to the film's romantic subplot. Thor earned $449.3 million worldwide to emerge as the 15th highest-grossing film of 2011.

In 2012, Portman topped Forbes' listing of the most bankable stars in Hollywood. Her sole screen appearance that year was in Paul McCartney's music video "My Valentine", alongside Johnny Depp. The following year, she reprised the role of Jane Foster in Thor: The Dark World, which earned over $644 million worldwide to emerge as the 10th highest-grossing film of 2013. Forbes featured her in their Celebrity 100 listing of 2014, and estimated her income from the previous year to be $13 million.

In 2015, Portman appeared alongside an ensemble cast, including Christian Bale, in Terrence Malick's experimental drama film Knight of Cups, which marked her first project after giving birth. She shot for it within a week of returning to work and she did not receive a traditional script or dialogues, improvising most of her scenes with Bale. She said that shooting with Malick influenced her own directorial venture, A Tale of Love and Darkness which was released in the same year. Based on Israeli author Amos Oz's autobiographical novel of the same name which is set in Jerusalem during the last years of the British Mandate of Palestine, the Hebrew-language film starred Portman who also produced and co-wrote it. She had wanted to adapt the book since she first read it a decade ago, but postponed it until she was old enough to play the leading role of a mother herself. She collaborated closely with Amos, showing him drafts of her script as she adapted the book. While the film received partial funding from the rightist Israeli government, Portman said the film was "absolutely not" pro-Israeli or patriotic. The film also touches on the dispossession of Palestinians resulting from the 1948 war during Israel's founding phase. She later remarked that it was easier to be a female director in Israel than in the U.S., "thanks to the IDF". She explained that Israeli men are accustomed to female officers and commanders, "making it easier for them to accept female authority." Critics gave the film generally positive reviews. A. O. Scott of The New York Times found it to be a "conscientious adaptation of a difficult book" and was appreciative of Portman's potential as a filmmaker.

She next produced and starred in the western film Jane Got a Gun about a young mother seeking vengeance. Initially scheduled to be directed by Lynne Ramsay, the production was plagued with numerous difficulties. Ramsay did not turn up on set for the first day of filming and was eventually replaced with Gavin O'Connor. Michael Fassbender, Jude Law, and Bradley Cooper were all cast as the male lead, before Ewan McGregor played the part. Peter Bradshaw of The Guardian reviewed that Portman's "stately performance" was not enough to save the "laborious and solemn western", and it grossed less than $4 million against its $25 million budget.

=== 2016–present: Jackie and production ventures ===
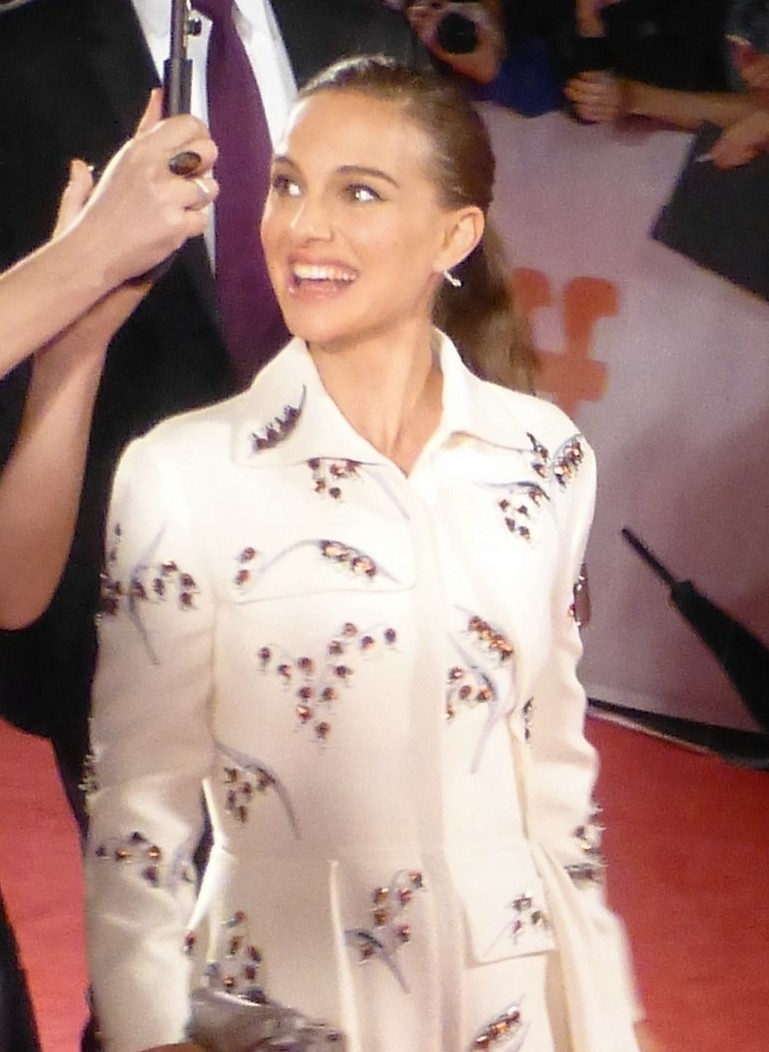
Portman attending the premiere of Planetarium at the 2016 Toronto International Film Festival

Portman portrayed Jacqueline Kennedy in the Pablo Larraín-directed biopic Jackie (2016), about Kennedy's life immediately after the 1963 assassination of her husband. She was initially intimidated to take on the part of a well-known public figure, and eventually researched Kennedy extensively by watching videos of her, reading books, and listening to audiotapes of her interviews. She also worked with a dialect coach to adopt Kennedy's unique speaking style. David Rooney of The Hollywood Reporter termed it an "incandescent performance" and added that "her Jackie is both inscrutable and naked, broken but unquestionably resilient, a mess and yet fiercely dignified". She won the Critics' Choice Movie Award for Best Actress and received a nomination for the Academy Award for Best Actress. She also served as producer for the comedy horror film Pride and Prejudice and Zombies, directed by Burr Steers, and starred in Rebecca Zlotowski's French-Belgian drama Planetarium. The 2017 experimental romance Song to Song marked Portman's second collaboration with Terrence Malick, which like their previous film polarized critics. That year, Portman revealed that she has experienced sexual harassment or discrimination in almost every project she has worked on, despite initially believing she had avoided such experiences.

In 2018, Portman starred in the science fiction film Annihilation, based on Jeff VanderMeer's novel. She played a biologist and former soldier who studies a mysterious quarantined zone of mutating organisms. She was pleased to headline a rare female-led science fiction film, and she moved her family near Pinewood Studios during filming. For the action sequences, she underwent movement training with the dancer Bobbi Jene Smith. Benjamin Lee of The Guardian took note of Portman's "strong, fiercely compelling presence" and commended her for playing the part without unnecessary sentimentality. It only received a limited theatrical release and was distributed on Netflix internationally. Her next appearance was in Xavier Dolan's first English-language film, the ensemble drama The Death & Life of John F. Donovan (2018), which was termed a "shocking misfire" by Eric Kohn of IndieWire. She then starred as a troubled pop singer in Vox Lux, sharing the part with Raffey Cassidy. She was drawn to the idea of showcasing the negative effects of fame, and in preparation, she watched documentaries on musicians and listened to the music of Sia, who wrote her songs in the film. For the climactic dance routines, she trained with her then-husband, Benjamin Millepied, who choreographed the sequence. It received mixed reviews from critics, but Portman's performance earned praise. Comparing it to her performances in Black Swan and Jackie, Robbie Collin of The Daily Telegraph wrote that "this role has a similar audacity and extravagance that few actresses would dare attempt, let alone be allowed to get away with".

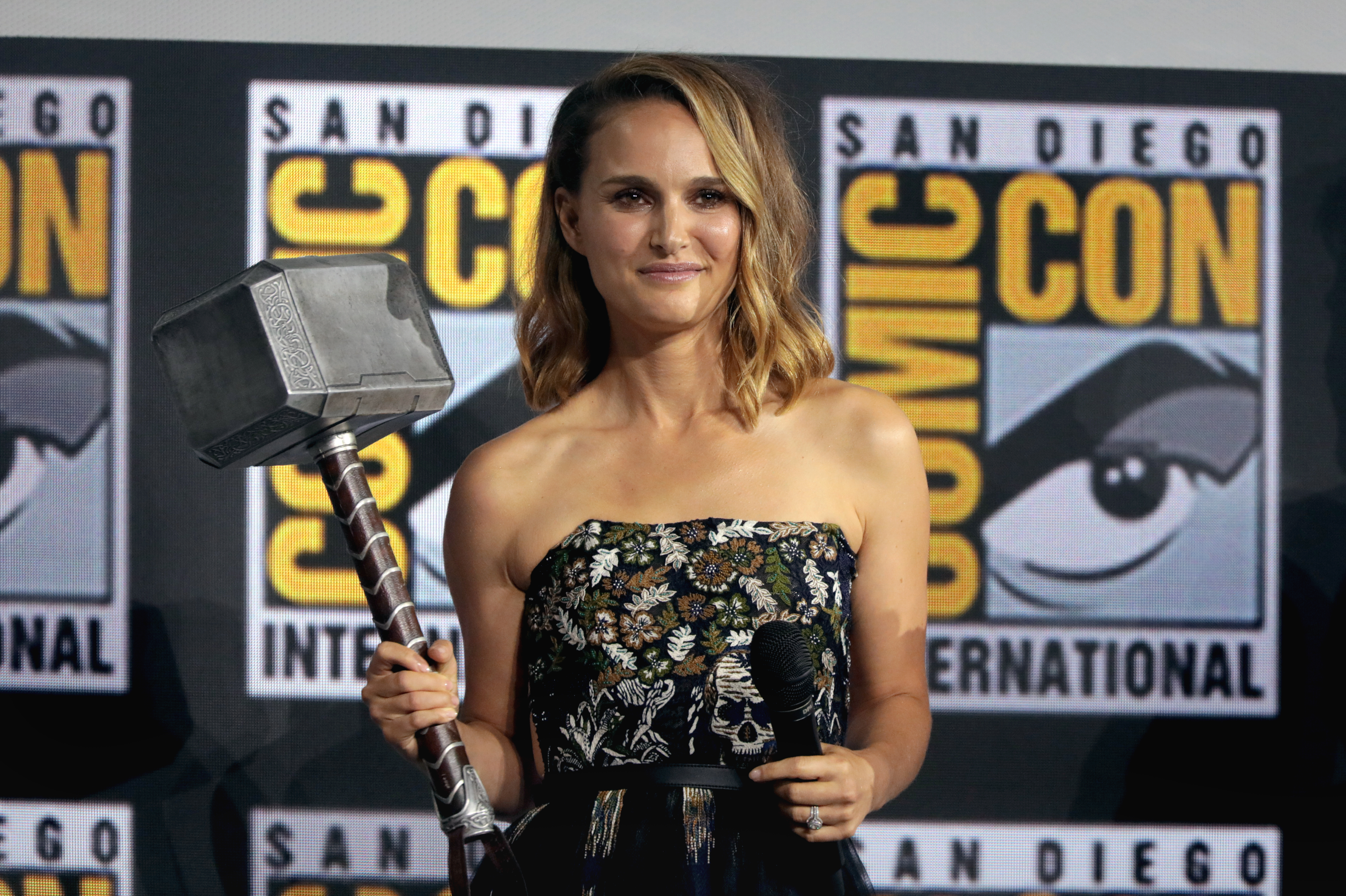
Portman at the 2019 San Diego Comic-Con promoting Thor: Love and Thunder

Unused footage from Thor: The Dark World and a new voice-over were used for Portman's brief appearance in the 2019 superhero film Avengers: Endgame. She then portrayed a psychologically troubled astronaut (based on Lisa Nowak) in the drama Lucy in the Sky, directed by Noah Hawley. She replaced the film's producer Reese Witherspoon, who backed out due to a scheduling conflict. The film was poorly received, though Portman's performance was praised. The following year, she narrated the Disney+ nature documentary Dolphin Reef and voiced Jane Foster in the animated series What If...?. In 2022, Portman reprised her role as Foster in the sequel Thor: Love and Thunder, in which her character becomes Mighty Thor. She agreed to return to the franchise after meeting with director Taika Waititi, who offered to portray her character in an "adventurous and fun and funny" way. In preparation, Portman took the Mjolnir prop home to practice using it for her stunts. Nick Allen at RogerEbert.com opined, "In both her human and her heroic state, Portman's performance conveys why it's great to see Jane again." Portman received a nomination for the Critics' Choice Super Award for Best Actress in a Superhero Movie. In a 2022 readers' poll by Empire magazine, Portman was voted one of the 50 greatest actors of all time.

Portman and her producing partner, Sophie Mas, founded the production company MountainA in 2021, and signed a first-look television deal with Apple TV+. The company's first project was May December, a drama from filmmaker Todd Haynes, starring Portman and Julianne Moore, which premiered at the 2023 Cannes Film Festival. Portman played an actress researching for her role as a woman (played by Moore) whose marriage to a much younger man was highly controversial. She was pleased to work with Haynes, whose work she admired, and to play a morally ambiguous character. Geoffrey Macnab of The Independent believed that the film had been "galvanised by the tremendous performances from Portman and Moore". Portman received another Golden Globe nomination for her performance. The company next produced the HBO documentary series Angel City, about the inaugural season of Angel City FC, which was co-founded by Portman.

MountainA's third project was Lady in the Lake (2024), an Apple TV+ miniseries adaptation of Laura Lippman's thriller novel. Portman played a 1960s housewife in Baltimore who turns into an investigative journalist following an unsolved murder. Production in Baltimore was briefly paused when the crew received threats of violence. Continuing her collaboration with Apple TV+, Portman will next star in Fountain of Youth, an adventure film directed by Guy Ritchie. She will also star alongside Jenna Ortega in Cathy Yan's thriller film The Gallerist.

== Endorsements ==
Beyond her acting career, Portman has been a longtime ambassador for Dior. She signed with the brand in 2010 and has starred in multiple advertising campaigns. In March 2011, Portman began voluntarily promoting a fundraising campaign for Hadassah Medical Center in Jerusalem. The campaign was aimed at raising funds for the construction of the Sarah Wetsman Davidson Tower, a new hospitalization tower at the hospital's Ein Kerem campus, which was open in 2012. The campaign was a joint effort with the Hadassah Women's Zionist Organization of America, which owns the hospital. Later in October 2012, Britain's Advertising Standards Authority banned a Dior advertisement that featured Portman wearing Dior mascara after a complaint from Dior's competitor, L'Oreal, saying that the advert "misleadingly exaggerated the likely effects of the product". The ASA ruled that "the ad was likely to mislead". Portman is the face of one of the company's fragrances, Miss Dior, inspired by Catherine Dior. She has starred in campaign videos for the fragrance, and promoted a new version of the fragrance, Rose N'Roses, in 2021.

In July 2020, she became one of the leaders of the creation of NWSL soccer team Angel City FC and also became one of the owners of the team.

== Activism ==
=== Animal and human rights ===
Portman became a vegetarian at age eight after witnessing a demonstration of laser surgery on a chicken during a medical conference with her father. She became a vegan in 2009 after reading Jonathan Safran Foer's book Eating Animals, and later produced a documentary on factory farming in the United States, also titled Eating Animals. In 2017, she received the Ongoing Commitment Award from the Environmental Media Association for her work on the film. She does not wear animal products and has praised animal-friendly products designed by Stella McCartney and Target. In 2007, she launched her own brand of animal-friendly footwear. In 2007, Portman traveled to Rwanda with Jack Hanna to film the documentary Gorillas on the Brink. Portman has been an advocate of environmental causes since childhood, when she joined an environmental song and dance troupe known as World Patrol Kids.

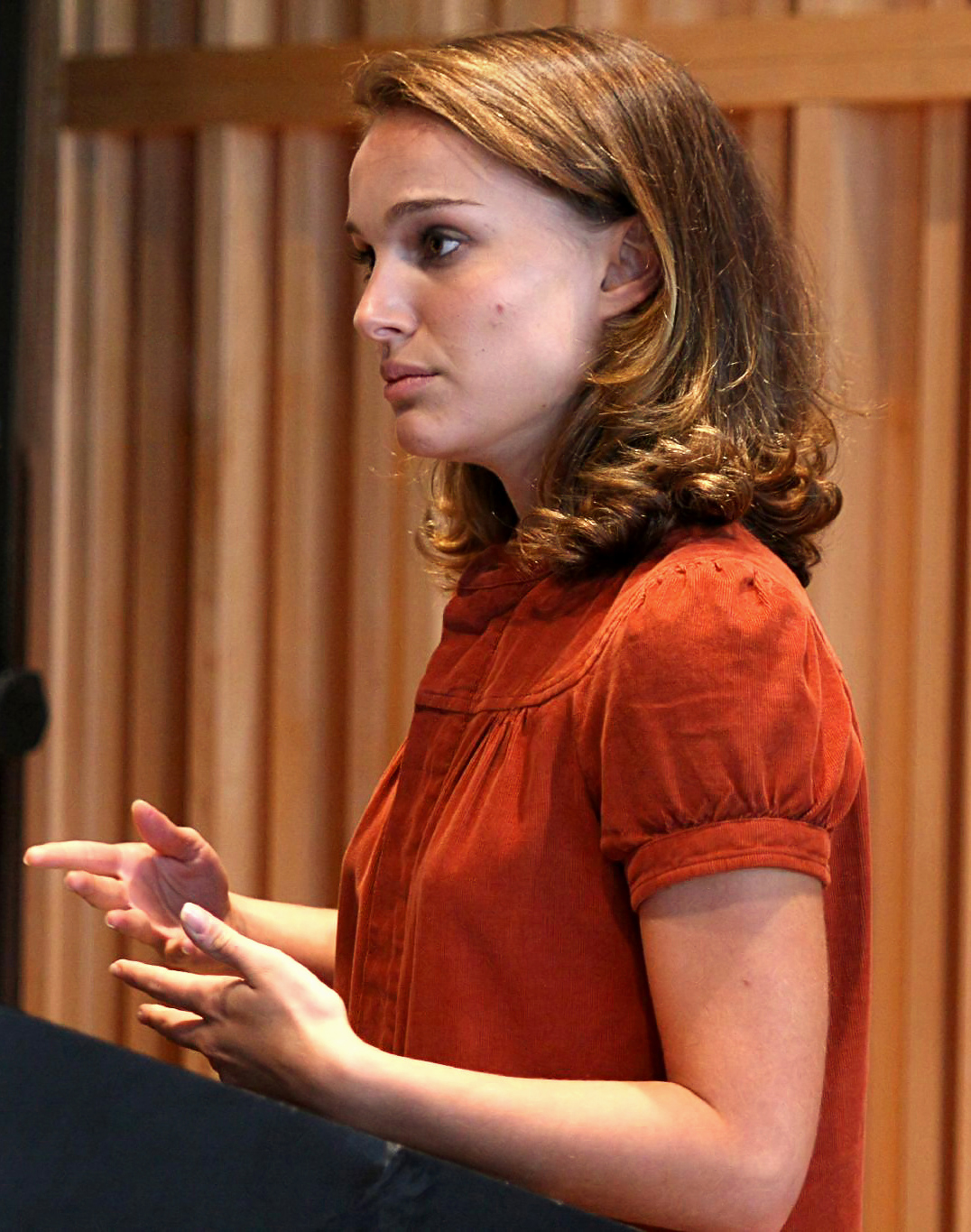
Portman speaking about the global microfinance organization FINCA at Columbia University in 2007

Portman has also supported anti-poverty causes. In 2004 and 2005, she traveled to Uganda, Guatemala, and Ecuador as the Ambassador of Hope for FINCA International, an organization that promotes micro-lending to help finance women-owned businesses in developing countries. In an interview appearing on the PBS program Foreign Exchange with Fareed Zakaria, she discussed microfinance. Host Fareed Zakaria said that he was "generally wary of celebrities with fashionable causes", but included the segment with Portman because "she really knew her stuff". On This Week with George Stephanopoulos in April 2007, Portman discussed her work with FINCA and how it can benefit women and children in Third World countries. In fall-2007, she visited several university campuses, including Harvard, USC, UCLA, UC Berkeley, Stanford, Princeton, New York University, and Columbia, to inspire students with the power of microfinance and to encourage them to join the Village Banking Campaign to help families and communities lift themselves out of poverty.

Portman is a supporter of the Democratic Party, and for the 2004 presidential election she campaigned for Senator John Kerry. Prior to the 2008 presidential election, she supported Senator Hillary Clinton of New York in the Democratic primaries. Portman later campaigned for Senator Barack Obama of Illinois. In a 2008 interview, she also stated: "I even like John McCain. I disagree with his war stance – which is a really big deal – but I think he's a very moral person." In 2010, her activist work and popularity with young people earned her a nomination for VH1's Do Something Awards, which is dedicated to honoring individuals who do good. In 2011, Portman and her then-fiancé Benjamin Millepied were among the signers of a petition to President Obama in support of same-sex marriage. She supported Obama's re-election campaign in 2012.

In 2009, Portman signed a petition that defended Roman Polanski, who was charged with drugging and raping a thirteen-year-old girl in 1977, and has been a fugitive for decades. In February 2018, she expressed regret over signing the petition.

In January 2011, Portman was appointed an ambassador of WE Charity (formerly known as Free The Children), an international charity and educational partner, spearheading their Power of a Girl campaign. She hosted a contest challenging girls in North America to fundraise for one of WE Charity's all-girl schools in Kenya. As incentives for the contest winner, Portman offered the designer Rodarte dress she wore to the premiere of Black Swan, along with tickets to her next film premiere. It was announced in May 2012 that Portman would be working with watch designer Richard Mille to develop a limited-edition timepiece with proceeds supporting WE Charity. During WE Day California 2019 Portman gave a pro vegan speech in front of the student audience, linking vegan lifestyle and feminism. In December 2019, she visited Kenya a second time with WE Charity and spoke with young girls determined to improve their lives through access to education.

In 2006, Portman served as a guest lecturer at Columbia University for a course in terrorism and counterterrorism, where she spoke about her film V for Vendetta. In February 2015, Portman was among other alumni of Harvard University including Robert F. Kennedy Jr., Darren Aronofsky and Susan Faludi who wrote an open letter to the school demanding it divest its $35,900,000,000 endowment from coal, gas, and oil companies. Later that year in May, she spoke at the annual Harvard Class Day to the graduating class of 2015.

In January 2018, Portman donated $50,000 to the Time's Up initiative. She took part in the 2018 Women's March in Los Angeles, where she spoke about the "sexual terrorism" she experienced at age thirteen after the release of her film Léon: The Professional. She told the crowd, "I understood very quickly, even as a 13-year-old, that if I were to express myself sexually I would feel unsafe and that men would feel entitled to discuss and objectify my body to my great discomfort." She drew attention to the MeToo movement, revealing that her first fan letter was a "rape fantasy" from a man and that her local radio station created a countdown until her eighteenth birthday (when she would reach legal age to consent to have intercourse). Portman also added that she avoided roles with kissing scenes and presented herself as "prudish, conservative, nerdy, serious" in an effort to feel that her body was safe and her voice would be heard. During the event, she wore a "Make America Gay Again" hat, a parody of the "Make America Great Again" slogan.

In 2020, Portman endorsed the "defund the police" movement. In 2020, Portman collaborated with JusticeLA to create a public service announcement #SuingToSaveLives about the health of people in L.A. County jails amid the COVID-19 pandemic. Later in 2020, Portman was announced as one of the co-founders and investors in an almost all-female group that was awarded a new franchise in the National Women's Soccer League, the top level of the women's sport in the U.S. The new team, since unveiled as Angel City FC, began play in the 2022 NWSL season.

In September 2023, Portman spoke at an event for the United Nations Spotlight Initiative to eliminate violence against women and girls, where she urged member states to reinvest in the Initiative and ending gender-based violence. In October 2024, she attended the 2024 Ballon d'Or ceremony in Paris, where she presented the award for the best female player.

At the 2026 Sundance Film Festival, she wore "ICE OUT" and "BE GOOD" buttons in support of opposition to actions by U.S. Immigration and Customs Enforcement (ICE), criticizing the government's immigration enforcement policies as "the worst of the worst of humanity" while praising people who organize and support communities in response to injustice.

=== Views on sexuality and social issues ===
Portman also explained that being sexualized as a child affected her relationship with her own sexuality, saying that "at that age, you do have your own sexuality, and you do have your own desire" and "you do want to explore things, and you do want to be open," but that she did not feel safe when older men expressed interest in her. She also described developing a serious public image as a way of protecting herself, saying, "That kind of projection of seriousness protected me in a way," and that it acted as "almost a warning signal" to discourage unwanted attention. Portman had also said that she wondered about her sexuality while growing up but had never dated a woman. In a 2002 interview with Rolling Stone, Portman explained that she believes love is about the individual rather than gender, asking why someone would close themselves off to half of the people they could potentially love. She added that she has often found it easier to connect with men socially while valuing her friendships with women.

=== Views on Israel ===
Haaretz has described Portman as "one of Israel's outspoken supporters"; advocating through academic articles, lectures, and public declarations. Haaretz cited Portman raising funds for the reconstruction of northern Israel after the 2006 Lebanon War as a notable example of her support. The Forward reports that many Jews and Zionists, along with figures like Mik Moore, see Portman as a Liberal Zionist, as she believes in Israel's right to exist but is critical of its government, particularly Benjamin Netanyahu. In reference to his re-election in 2015, saying she was "disappointed" and found his comments racist. However, Portman herself has described her relationship with Israel as complex, "like family—you love it more than anything else in the world, and you are also more critical of it than anything else in the world."

In 2002, at Harvard, Portman wrote a letter to The Harvard Crimson in response to an essay critical of Israeli actions toward Palestinians, arguing that it misleadingly compared the situation to racial apartheid and that instead "most Israelis and Palestinians are indistinguishable physically".

In November 2017, Portman was announced as the Genesis Prize recipient for 2018, which includes $2,000,000 in prize money. The following April, Portman announced that she did not plan to attend the awards ceremony scheduled for June, citing "recent events in Israel" that left her feeling uncomfortable attending public events there, leading to the ceremony being canceled. The statement did not specify which events, but was suggested as referencing the killings and wounding of Palestinian protestors by Israeli fire during the 2018–2019 Gaza border protests. Portman's decision sparked backlash from Israeli politicians, including Culture Minister Miri Regev, Minister of Public Security and Strategic Affairs Gilad Erdan and American rabbi Shmuley Boteach, who accused the actress of being influenced by the Boycott, Divestment and Sanctions movement. The Likud party condemned Portman's position, with Knesset member Oren Hazan calling for her Israeli citizenship to be revoked.

Portman clarified that she was not boycotting Israel, stating, "I am not part of the BDS movement and do not endorse it. Like many Israelis and Jews, I can be critical of Israel's leadership without wanting to boycott the nation." She explained that she did not want to "appear as endorsing" Prime Minister Netanyahu, who was scheduled to speak at the ceremony, and emphasized that "the mistreatment of those suffering from today's atrocities is not in line with my Jewish values." She added, "Because I care about Israel, I must stand up against violence, corruption, inequality, and abuse of power". Later in 2018, Portman criticized the passing of the highly controversial and widely criticized Nation-State Bill, describing the law as "racist, and there's nothing else to say about that." She was also a member of the One Voice movement.

On October 18, 2023, Portman called for the release of hostages held by Hamas and condemned their actions. She also advocated for Israeli children who have been kidnapped, urging support for their release. Additionally, she publicized information about Dror Israel on Instagram to raise funds for children near the Gaza border and called on the Red Cross to address ongoing breaches of International Humanitarian Law within Israel. On November 12, 2023, she took part in the March for the Republic and Against Antisemitism in Paris in response to the rise in antisemitism since the start of the Gaza war.

== Personal life ==
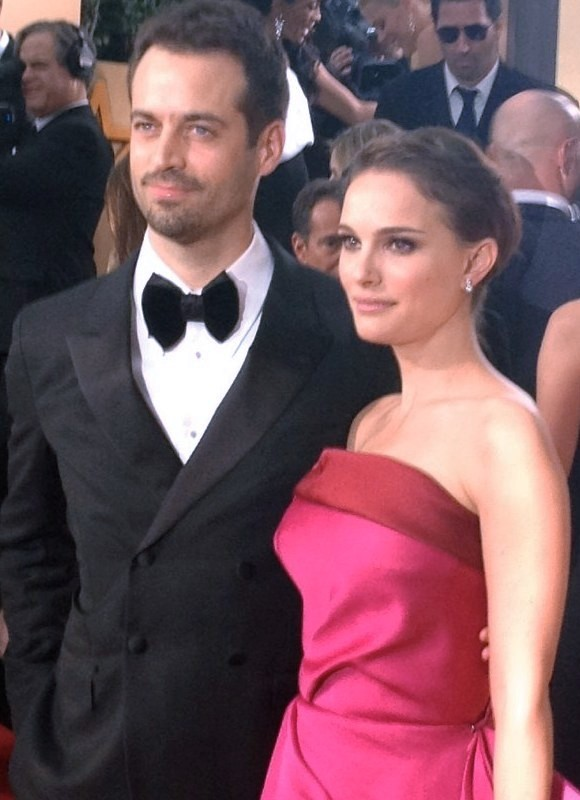
Portman with Benjamin Millepied in 2012

In 2009, Portman met the dancer and choreographer Benjamin Millepied on the set of Black Swan. The two were married on August 4, 2012, in a Jewish ceremony in Big Sur, California. Portman and Millepied have a son (born 2011) and a daughter (born 2017). In 2014, Portman and her family relocated to Paris after Millepied was appointed director of dance at the Paris Opera Ballet. (Note: Attributed to multiple references:) On March 8, 2024, it was announced that Portman and Millepied had divorced. Prior to meeting Millepied, Portman had dated Zach Braff, Jake Gyllenhaal, and Devendra Banhart.

Portman began dating the French music producer Tanguy Destable in March 2025, and gave birth to her third child in September 2026. (Note: Attributed to multiple references:) From 2017 to 2021, Portman owned a home in Montecito, California. As of 2022, she owns a home in the Los Feliz neighborhood of Los Angeles.

== Filmography and awards ==
Portman's most acclaimed and highest-grossing films, according to the online portal Box Office Mojo and the review aggregate site Rotten Tomatoes, include Star Wars: Episode I – The Phantom Menace (1999), Star Wars: Episode II – Attack of the Clones (2002), Closer (2004), Star Wars: Episode III – Revenge of the Sith (2005), V for Vendetta (2005), Black Swan (2010), No Strings Attached (2011), Thor (2011), Thor: The Dark World (2013), Jackie (2016), Annihilation (2018), and Thor: Love and Thunder (2022).

Portman has received numerous accolades for her work, including an Academy Award, a BAFTA Award, two Golden Globe Awards and a Screen Actors Guild Award.

== See also ==
- List of actors with Academy Award nominations
- List of actors with more than one Academy Award nomination in the acting categories
- List of Israeli Academy Award winners and nominees
- List of Jewish Academy Award winners and nominees
- List of Golden Globe winners

== Bibliography ==
- Dickerson, James L. (2002). Natalie Portman: Queen of Hearts. ECW Press. ISBN 9781550224924.
- Dickerson, James L. (2012). Natalie Portman's Stark Reality: A Biography. Sartoris Literary Group. ISBN 9780985513597.
