= Ayelet Waldman =

American-Israeli writer (born 1964)

- איילת ולדמן
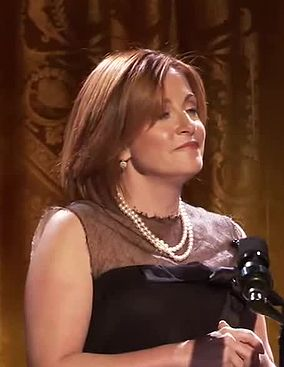
- Waldman in 2009
- Born: December 11, 1964 (age 61); Jerusalem
- Education: Wesleyan University (BA); Harvard University (JD)
- Occupations: Novelist, essayist
- Spouse: Michael Chabon (m. 1993)
- Children: 4
- Writing career
- Language: English
- Notable works: Love and Other Impossible Pursuits, Bad Mother: A Chronicle...
- Website: ayeletwaldman.com

Ayelet Waldman (Hebrew: איילת ולדמן; born December 11, 1964) is an Israeli-American novelist and essayist. She has written seven mystery novels in the series The Mommy-Track Mysteries and four other novels. She has also written autobiographical essays about motherhood. Waldman spent three years working as a federal public defender and her fiction draws on her experience as a lawyer.

== Biography ==
Ayelet Waldman was born in Jerusalem. Her grandparents on both sides were Jewish immigrants to North America from Ukraine early in the 20th century. Her father, Leonard, was from Montreal, Canada, but was living in Israel when he met her mother, Ricki. After they married, they moved to Jerusalem. After the Six-Day War in 1967, the family moved back to Montreal, then Rhode Island, finally settling in Ridgewood, New Jersey, when Waldman was in sixth grade.

She was raised in a Jewish family, attended Hebrew school and Jewish summer camps, and lived on a kibbutz in Israel for a year while in the tenth grade. She has said that her parents were atheists, but very Jewish, and that her "whole life was immersed in Judaism, but in a very specific kind of Labor–Zionist Judaism." Despite this, she did not celebrate becoming a bat mitzvah.

Waldman attended Wesleyan University, where she studied psychology and government, and studied in Israel in her junior year, graduating in 1986. She returned to Israel after college to again live on a kibbutz, but found it too sexist for her taste. She then entered Harvard Law School and graduated with a J.D. in 1991.

Waldman has been married to fellow author Michael Chabon since 1993. They live in a 1907 Craftsman house in the Elmwood district of Berkeley, California. The couple work from the same office in the backyard of their home. They edit each other's work, and offer each other advice on writing, sometimes going on "plot walks" to discuss issues. In 2025, Waldman and Chabon's son Abraham, then a 22-year-old student at New York University was arrested and charged with both "rape and strangulation." The rape charge was later dropped.

Many characters in her fiction are Jewish. Her novel Love and Treasure is about the Holocaust.

Waldman has written several times about her 2002 diagnosis of bipolar disorder, an illness that runs in her family, and has spoken publicly about parenting while having a mental illness.

== Legal and academic career ==
After graduating from law school, Waldman clerked for a federal judge, worked in a large corporate law firm in New York for a year, and then moved to California with Michael Chabon, where she became a criminal defense lawyer. Waldman was a federal public defender for three years in the Central District of California. Chabon mentioned on their first date that it was his intention to care for his children so his wife could pursue her career, which he did after the birth of their first and second children. After the birth of her first child, she tried juggling legal work with mothering, then left her job to be with her husband and child. This was short-lived.

Waldman was an adjunct professor at the Boalt Hall School of Law at the University of California, Berkeley from 1997 to 2003. She also worked as a consultant to the Drug Policy Alliance, a resource center advocating a drug policy based on harm reduction. While working as an adjunct professor, she found writing scholarly articles uninteresting and intimidating, so she began writing fiction instead. According to Waldman, her fiction is "all about being a bad mother." Waldman said she would not return to the legal profession. In her fiction Waldman has drawn extensively on her legal experience.

== Literary career ==
Waldman has written various online and print articles about mothering while at home on maternity leave after the birth of her first child and again after she left her job as a public defender. She has at various times said that she chose to write because it was not as time-consuming a career as the law, because it gave her something to do during naptimes, it kept her entertained, because she was starved of someone to laugh at her jokes and because it gave her a way of putting off going back to work.

=== Mommy-Track Mysteries ===
In 1997, Waldman started writing mystery novels, thinking they would be "easy … light and fluffy." At first she wrote in secret, then with her husband's encouragement. She has said that she chose mysteries because they are primarily about plot. Waldman has said that her first mystery work, eventually published as Nursery Crimes, was her first attempt at creative writing, describing it as her first piece of fiction "aside from my legal briefs."

Waldman wrote seven novels about the "part-time sleuth and full-time mother" Juliet Applebaum. Waldman has said of Juliet, "She is me, well, she was me," and "They say to write what you know … so I wrote exactly what I knew." Like Waldman, Juliet is a 5-foot-tall (1.5 m), red-headed former public defender with a nocturnal writer for a husband, who has become a stay-at-home mother but finds it boring. To relieve her boredom, Juliet works as a part-time detective. The collective title of the series is The Mommy-Track Mysteries. The novels are humorous and Waldman has said of her criminals, "My villains aren't villains. They're people whose crime you understand." Waldman has previously said that Bye-Bye, Black Sheep is likely to be the last, but her agent's website notes that she is working on more mysteries.

=== Novels ===
In addition to the mystery genre, Waldman has published three other novels. Daughter's Keeper, published in 2003, drew on Waldman's experience as a criminal defense lawyer and representation of drug offenders. The first manuscript was rejected thirty-one times. It features a young woman, Olivia, who inadvertently becomes involved in the trafficking of drugs and her relationship with her emotionally reserved mother. The book is also about the impact of federal drug policy, particularly mandatory minimum sentencing, on the criminal justice system. The novel was inspired by a case Waldman handled. The book was generally well received, and was a finalist for the 2003 Northern California Book Award.

Love and Other Impossible Pursuits, published in 2006, is about a Harvard-educated lawyer with a precocious stepson who loses a newborn child to SIDS. The impetus was the loss of her own unborn child diagnosed with a genetic abnormality. The book also deals with how mothers criticize each other's mothering, a theme in Waldman's nonfiction too. It explores negative feelings towards one's own children. The novel was also reviewed well in places, although some reviews were negative.

Don Roos wrote and directed a film based on the novel, starring Natalie Portman, Lisa Kudrow and Scott Cohen. The film premiered at the Toronto Film Festival in August 2009.

Waldman's Red Hook Road, published in 2010, is about two bereaved families in a small village in Maine and the effect of a family tragedy and class differences on marriage, styles of motherhood (including the domineering), and family life. It is also about boxing and boat building.

A Perfect Hand, published in 2026, is a novel set in 19th century England and tells the tale of a maid and her lover.

=== Short stories ===
Waldman has contributed short stories to the anthologies McSweeney's Stories of Love and Neuroses (2003) and McSweeney's Enchanted Chamber of Astonishing Stories (2004), the latter of which was edited by Michael Chabon. The short story "Minnow," which appeared in McSweeney's Enchanted Chamber of Astonishing Stories, is about a woman who is haunted by her dead baby. Again, she regards this as related to the loss of her own child. A horror film is being developed, based on the short story.

=== Nonfiction ===
Waldman has written many personal essays for online and print publications aspects of motherhood, such as how women criticize each other's mothering (that is, the "mommy wars"), combining paid work with motherhood, and how the upbringing of those raised in a postfeminist era clashed with the reality of having to make professional sacrifices. Her essays have also explored the sexuality of mothers and of young people, homework, extended family life, body image, aging, literary hoaxes, and Jewish life. Although most of her nonfiction is personal, she has also written on aspects of the criminal justice system.

In 2016, Waldman and her husband Michael Chabon, in collaboration with the "Breaking the Silence" organization, initiated the production of an anthology that includes articles written by writers from around the world about the Israeli occupation, to mark the 50th anniversary of the Six-Day War. As part of the project, about 50 writers visited Israel, including Dave Eggers, Colm Tóibín and Mario Vargas Llosa. The book was published under the title "Kingdom of Olives and Ash: Writers Confront the Occupation", in June 2017.

=== Motherlove ===
Her 2005 essay "Motherlove" was first published in the anthology Because I Said So: 33 Mothers Write About Children, Sex, Men, Aging, Faith, Race and Themselves, where she thought it would have only a small readership. However, it was reprinted in the Modern Love section of the New York Times in March 2005 under the headline "Truly, Madly, Guiltily." It can be read online here. Waldman's essay led to extensive and vitriolic debate, on television shows like The View, on internet blogs, in coffee shops, and elsewhere. Some people even threatened to report Waldman to the Department of Social Services in relation to the perceived mistreatment of her family. Oprah Winfrey, who said she was "very brave" for speaking out, invited Waldman onto her television show to discuss her views on love, marriage, and motherhood.

=== Bad Mother ===
After Waldman complained about the response to her essay, a friend suggested she write a book about it. In 2009, Waldman published a collection of her personal essays, Bad Mother: A Chronicle of Maternal Crimes, Minor Calamities, and Occasional Moments of Grace. The book argues that no woman can be a perfect mother, that, in fact, competitive, neurotic parenting and having unrealistic expectations may be damaging to children. Waldman contends that she finds society (particularly women, in what she calls the "Bad Mother police") to be too hard on other women's parenting skills. The book includes chapters on women's criticism of the mothering by other women, feminism, motherhood, and associated anxieties, including anxieties about breastfeeding, marriage, sexuality of mothers and teenagers, homework, mental illness, the loss of her unborn child, and her relationship with her mother-in-law. The book was a New York Times bestseller, and generally it received favorable reviews.

=== A Really Good Day ===
A Really Good Day was published in January 2017 and documents Waldman's taking microdoses of LSD to help cope with her debilitating mood and anxiety disorders. She learned about this practice from a 2011 book by psychedelic researcher James Fadiman. A Really Good Day was called "an engaging and deeply researched primer on a taboo subject and a strong case for more research on it" by Nora Krug for the Washington Post. Jennifer Senior of the New York Times noted that Waldman "is wielding her powers of provocation to goad us into an uncomfortable but necessary conversation. Quibble with her style, her methods, her desire to attract attention. In normalizing the conversation about LSD, she may one day help others feel normal."

=== Blogs ===
For a short time in 2004 and 2005, Waldman wrote a blog under the title "Bad Mother." Her topics included sexuality, gay rights, motherhood, and her bipolar disorder. She said "A blog like this is narcissism in its most obscene flowering. But it's necessary. As a parent your days are consumed by other people's needs. This is payback for driving back and forth to gymnastics all week long." On her reaction to the criticism that her blogging engendered, she has said "It's ridiculous to be so willing to expose myself and at the same time be so hypersensitive. Those are two contradictory impulses no one person should have." After an incident where she hinted at suicidal thoughts, she decided to discontinue the blog. Although she found it a therapeutic way to channel frustrations – likening the experience to "slashing my wrists and haemorrhaging all over the computer screen" – she found it was having a deleterious effect on her writing. Waldman blogged on the 2008 Democratic National Convention and had a blog on her own website from 2008 to 2009 on a variety of subjects.

== Television ==
Between 2015 and 2019, Waldman worked on the development of the acclaimed Netflix television show Unbelievable. She created it with her spouse Michael Chabon and veteran writer Susannah Grant. She had the original idea for the show after reading the Pulitzer-winning article it is based on: "An Unbelievable Story of Rape".

She co-wrote with Chabon an episode of Star Trek: Picard, and is credited as a co-executive producer on five episodes. Her husband was the showrunner on the first season.

== Activism ==
During the 2008 presidential primaries and general election campaign, Waldman campaigned and raised funds in support of Barack Obama, acting as a full-time volunteer, speaking at fundraisers; she was appointed as a delegate to the 2008 Democratic National Convention.

On 26 April 2024, Waldman was arrested by Israeli police (along with six others, including three rabbis) as she tried to take food to Palestinians inside the Gaza Strip. Her husband Michael Chabon said at the time, “She was there in the company of a group of American rabbis, #rabbis4ceasefire, to show the world, the people of Gaza, and their fellow Jews in Israel, and around the world what Judaism teaches: justice, lovingkindness, peace, mercy, liberation.”

== Published works ==
=== "Mommy-Track" mystery novels ===
- Nursery Crimes (2000)
- The Big Nap (2001)
- Playdate With Death (2002)
- Death Gets a Time-Out (2003)
- Murder Plays House (2004)
- The Cradle Robbers (2005)
- Bye-Bye, Black Sheep (2006)

=== Other novels ===
- Daughter's Keeper (2003)
- Love and Other Impossible Pursuits (2006)
- Red Hook Road (2010) Doubleday
- Love and Treasure (2014) Hodder & Staughton. ISBN 978-1-4447-6311-9
- A Perfect Hand (2026)

=== Nonfiction ===
- Bad Mother: A Chronicle of Maternal Crimes, Minor Calamities, and Occasional Moments of Grace (2009)
- A Really Good Day: How Microdosing Made a Mega Difference in My Mood, My Marriage, and My Life (2017)
