= The Other Woman (2009 film) =

- Theatrical release poster
- Directed by: Don Roos
- Screenplay by: Don Roos
- Based on: Love and Other Impossible Pursuits by Ayelet Waldman
- Produced by: Carol Cuddy; Marc E. Platt
- Starring: Natalie Portman; Scott Cohen; Charlie Tahan; Lauren Ambrose; Lisa Kudrow
- Cinematography: Steve Yedlin
- Edited by: David Codron
- Music by: John Swihart
- Production companies: Incentive Filmed Entertainment; Marc Platt Productions; Is or Isn't Productions; Handsomecharlie Films
- Distributed by: IFC Films
- Release dates: 16 September 2009 (TIFF); 4 February 2011 (United States)
- Running time: 102 minutes
- Country: United States
- Language: English
- Box office: $1.4 million

The Other Woman is a 2009 American drama film written and directed by Don Roos. It is based on the Ayelet Waldman novel Love and Other Impossible Pursuits and stars Natalie Portman, Lisa Kudrow, and Charlie Tahan. It was released in the United Kingdom as Love and Other Impossible Pursuits. It was distributed by IFC Films in the US.

== Plot ==
Emilia (Natalie Portman) is a young lawyer from New York, who in a short time has seen her life come to tragedy: she and her husband Jack (Scott Cohen) have separated following the death of their only daughter, Isabel, from SIDS. Emilia views this loss as a punishment and cannot move on with her life by having more children after finding out she is sterile.

Vilified as a homewrecker, she attracts the unyielding ire of Jack's furious ex-wife, Carolyn (Lisa Kudrow), who is revealed to also be pregnant (after she heard about Isabel's death, she realized that she too wanted another child). Emilia thinks that this is purely out of spite. Now she must come to terms with her stepson, William (Charlie Tahan), who upsets her with constant references to her late little girl (including saying that under the terms of Jewish law, Isabel did not live long enough to be considered a full human being). Emilia's efforts to bond with William do not go well and succeed only in making both Carolyn and Jack think less of her.

Emilia finds the courage to tell Jack of the details never confessed about the death of their daughter Isabel. That morning, Emilia did not find her dead in the crib, but on her breast, where most likely the baby girl was suffocated after her mother had fallen asleep. Despite the fact that the couple had called an ambulance, there was nothing left to do. The terrible guilt of having killed her own daughter is the real cause of her uneasiness.

She moves out, tentatively mends fences with her father (who earlier had cheated on her mother), and joins her old friends at a Legal Aid office. She is surprised when Carolyn calls her and asks her to come by her office. After initially being upset about Emilia moving out, Carolyn admits to telling William there is a possibility Emilia did accidentally kill Isabel because of Emilia's thoughtless ways; Carolyn seems chastened when she adds that her son was angry at her attitude and told her she should be ashamed of herself. She then tells a stunned Emilia that she has personally looked into the autopsy report on Isabel, and she can confirm that Emilia did not kill her baby girl. Emilia starts crying at the realization that she has been punishing herself for so long and that it was not her fault. Emilia later goes to Jack and tells him the full story, and while he tells her at that point that he cannot reconcile with her, a crisis involving Carolyn's City Hall wedding and William leads to Emilia getting through to his son and Jack saying he wants to go on a date with her, leaving Emilia happy and strongly hinting the couple will get back together soon.

On the day that Carolyn's son is born, Emilia takes William to the park and gives him a boat that was given to her when she was his age, she then says, "I love you William" and he replies "I know." He looks at her and away again and says, "Me too." The film ends with a montage of pictures and art, showing the various figures in the story.

== Cast ==
- Natalie Portman as Emilia Greenleaf
- Scott Cohen as Jack Woolf
- Charlie Tahan as William Woolf
- Lauren Ambrose as Mindy
- Lisa Kudrow as Dr. Carolyn Soule
- Michael Cristofer as Sheldon
- Elizabeth Marvel as Pia
- Debra Monk as Laura
- Anthony Rapp as Simon
- Kendra Kassebaum as Sharlene
- Daisy Tahan as Emma
- Maria Dizzia as Jamie Brennan
- Mona Fastvold as Sonia
- Mary Joy as Marilyn

== Release ==
Post-production was completed in 2009 and the movie was released 2011.

== Reception ==
The film received mainly negative reviews from critics. Review aggregator website Rotten Tomatoes reported that 37% of 46 of its critics gave positive reviews, with an average rating of 5.5/10. The website's consensus reads, "Natalie Portman and Lisa Kudrow deliver fine performances in The Other Woman, but they're muted by Don Roos' clumsy direction and cluttered, melodramatic script." Metacritic, which assigns a weighted average score out of 100 to reviews from mainstream critics, gives the film a score of 37 based on 16 reviews, which is interpreted as "Generally unfavorable" by Metacritic.
