= Developing (film) =

Short film by Marya Cohn

- Directed by: Marya Cohn
- Starring: Natalie Portman; Frances Conroy
- Release date: 1995

Developing is a 1994 short film (28 minutes) directed by Marya Cohn, about the relationship between a girl and her single mother, who has breast cancer. The film, shot in 1993, stars Natalie Portman in her first film role and Frances Conroy. The short was Cohn's thesis film.

== Plot ==
Photographer Clare (Frances Conroy) learns she has breast cancer and must have a mastectomy. Returning home post-surgery, she struggles against her feelings of self-consciousness but tries to act as if all is normal in order to protect her daughter, Nina (Natalie Portman). However, she begins to begrudge Nina, and Nina, in turn, begins to resent being used by Clare as a model in her photographs.

Clare puts together a show of her photographs mostly featuring Nina. The show is a success but Clare feels uncomfortable as people constantly mention both her illness and her surgery. At the gallery, Clare and Nina fight when Nina accuses her of not letting her in and runs away. Clare then has a meltdown where she screams at a photographer covering the event after he takes numerous photos of her.

Failing to find Nina after returning home, Clare begins to take self-portraits using a mirror, gradually stripping off all her clothes. After finally confronting her own image in the mirror, she cries profusely. Later, as she is developing her self-portraits in her darkroom, Nina enters and apologizes for running away. Clare gives her a prolonged hug and Nina listens to her heart beat.

== Release ==
The film premiered at the 1995 Sundance Film Festival.
