= Love and Other Impossible Pursuits =

2006 novel by Ayelet Waldman

- Author: Ayelet Waldman
- Language: English
- Publisher: Doubleday
- Publication date: 24 January 2006
- Publication place: United States
- Media type: Print (Hardcover)
- Pages: 352 (Hardcover)
- ISBN: 0-385-51530-8
- OCLC: 57186438

Love and Other Impossible Pursuits is a novel by Israeli-American author Ayelet Waldman and released in 2006.

== Plot summary ==
Emilia Greenleaf is an attorney living in New York city with her husband, Jack Woolf. Emilia is the stepmother to Jack's remarkably intelligent eight-year-old son, William Woolf. William lives primarily with his mother, the medical doctor Carolyn Soule. It is Emilia's job, however, to pick up William from his nursery school every Wednesday afternoon. When she picks him up, Emilia is often subjected to snide glances and whispers from the other mothers because, it transpires, her relationship with her husband began when he was still with his wife. They had an office affair, and eventually the marriage dissolved. Later, the reader discovers that Emilia and Jack have recently lost their daughter, Isabel. They kept the little girl for 3 days, then she died during the night of SIDS in her mother's arms after being fed.

The bulk of the story deals with the results of Isabel's death, including the strain this puts on Emilia and Jack's marriage, as well as Emilia's feelings towards William. Emilia does not particularly like William (in fact, she describes him as "insufferable" early on in the story), but tries to be a good parent to him. This is hindered by the fact that William serves as his mother's mouthpiece, and sometimes speaks in a very matter-of-fact way about Isabel's death.

== Film adaptation ==
A film adaptation of the novel has been made with Natalie Portman starring in the lead role. The film was directed by Don Roos and also starred Scott Cohen and Charlie Tahan. Jennifer Lopez was initially signed to play the lead role, but Portman replaced her after she abruptly dropped out of the project. Production began in November 2008. After a successful screening at the Toronto Film Festival, the movie received only low dollar distribution offers because of the subject matter. The financiers decided to recut the movie and ended up with the released version which was panned by critics and which was contrary to the vision of the filmmakers.
