= Eve (2008 film) =

2008 film

- Directed by: Natalie Portman
- Written by: Natalie Portman
- Produced by: Annette Savitch
- Starring: Lauren Bacall; Ben Gazzara; Olivia Thirlby
- Cinematography: Adam Kimmel
- Edited by: Tricia Cooke
- Music by: Sufjan Stevens
- Production company: Handsomecharlie Films
- Distributed by: Relativity Media
- Release dates: September 1, 2008 (Venice); October 17, 2008 (Hamptons)
- Running time: 21 minutes
- Country: United States
- Language: English

Eve is a 2008 American romantic comedy short film written and directed by Natalie Portman, starring Lauren Bacall, Ben Gazzara, and Olivia Thirlby. The film was produced by her production company Handsomecharlie Films and distributed by Relativity Media.

== Plot ==
Kate (Olivia Thirlby) is a young woman visiting her grandmother (Lauren Bacall) to talk about her mother Eve, but instead she surprisingly ends up as both chauffeur and chaperone on her grandmother's romantic dinner date with a widower named Joe (Ben Gazzara).

== Cast ==
- Lauren Bacall as Grandma
- Olivia Thirlby as Kate
- Ben Gazzara as Joe
- Nicholas Rotundo as Maître D'
- Richard Delia as Bruce
- Chris Colombo as Stunt Driver

== Production ==
Eve was shot on location at the Firebird Restaurant in New York City.

== Release ==
Eve premiered at the 65th Venice International Film Festival on September 1, 2008 in Venice, Italy. The film opened the festival's short film section and was screened alongside 23 other films from around the world.

On October 17, 2008, Eve received its North American premiere when it was screened at the Hamptons International Film Festival in East Hampton, New York.
