= Hotel Chevalier =

2007 short film directed by Wes Anderson

- Promotional film poster
- Directed by: Wes Anderson
- Written by: Wes Anderson
- Starring: Jason Schwartzman; Natalie Portman
- Cinematography: Robert Yeoman
- Edited by: Vincent Marchand
- Music by: Pascal Rogé
- Production companies: American Empirical Pictures; Première Heure
- Distributed by: Fox Searchlight Pictures
- Release dates: September 2, 2007 (Venice Film Festival); September 26, 2007 (iTunes Store)
- Running time: 13 minutes
- Countries: United States; France
- Language: English

Hotel Chevalier is a 2007 short film written and directed by Wes Anderson. Starring Jason Schwartzman and Natalie Portman as former lovers who reunite in a Paris hotel room, the 13-minute film acts as a prologue to Anderson's 2007 feature The Darjeeling Limited. It was shot on location in a Parisian hotel by a small crew and self-financed by Anderson, who initially intended it to be a stand-alone work. Its first showing was at the Venice Film Festival premiere of the feature film on September 2, 2007, and it made its own debut later that month at Apple Stores in four U.S. cities.

The day after the film's premiere, it was made freely available from the iTunes Store for one month, during which time it was downloaded more than 500,000 times. The film garnered acclaim from reviewers, who compared it favorably to The Darjeeling Limited and praised its richness, poignancy, and careful construction.

== Plot ==
In a hotel lobby, the concierge answers a phone call from a guest's room. Jack (Jason Schwartzman) lies on a hotel bed in a yellow bathrobe, watching the black-and-white American war film Stalag 17 and reading the newspaper. After ordering room service from the concierge in broken French, he receives a call from Rhett, his ex-girlfriend. She tells him she is on her way from the airport and asks for his room number. Despite objecting that he did not tell her she could come, Jack consents nevertheless. He then hurriedly attempts to tidy the room – pausing to play the opening bars of the song "Where Do You Go To (My Lovely)?" by Peter Sarstedt on his stereo system – and runs a bath.

Jack is again lying on the bed, now in a gray suit. Hearing a knock, he starts the song playing again before opening the door to Rhett (Natalie Portman). After staring at him for several seconds, Rhett breaks the silence by asking what music is playing. Receiving no response, she steps into the room and presents Jack with a bouquet of flowers. When she moves to kiss him on the mouth, he turns his head away and they embrace instead. He closes the door and asks how she found him; she replies that it "wasn't actually that hard". She moves around the room browsing through his possessions, brushes her teeth with his toothbrush and declines to take the bath he had run for her.

Stepping back into the bedroom, Rhett turns to face the man and confronts him, asking slowly "what the fuck is going on?" Jack motions for her to join him on the bed and at her prompting, he reveals in the ensuing conversation that he has been living in the hotel room for "more than a month", and that he had left to escape their relationship. They lie back on the bed looking at one another before being interrupted by the arrival of room service. Once alone again, the two kiss and Jack begins to undress Rhett. They have an uncomfortable exchange about not having slept with other people and when Jack notices bruises on her arm after undressing her further, Rhett chooses not to comment on them. Lying on top of him, she tells Jack that she does not want to lose his friendship, that she loves him and never meant to hurt him. He responds coldly that he "will never be [her] friend", but holds her when she embraces him. "Where Do You Go To (My Lovely)?" starts again and Jack offers to show Rhett his view of Paris.

Rhett is perched against an armoire, Jack approaches and covers her naked body with the yellow bathrobe, and the two move towards the window. After they step out on the balcony, Jack draws a toothpick from his pocket and hands it to Rhett with an upwards nod, which she reciprocates. After looking out for another few seconds she clasps his neck lightly and they step back inside.

== Cast ==
- Jason Schwartzman as Jack Whitman
- Natalie Portman as Rhett

== Background and production ==
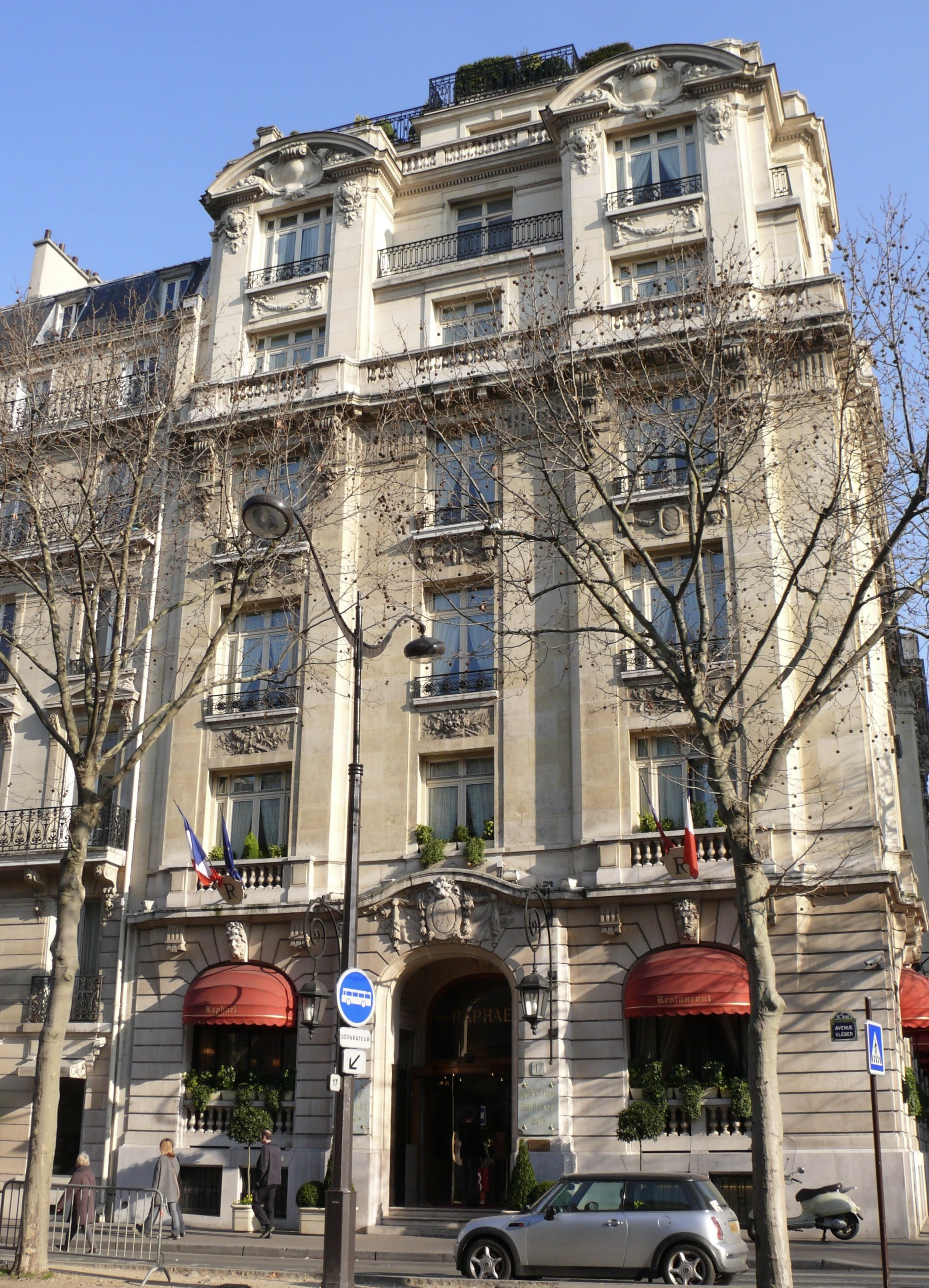
The Hôtel Raphaël in Paris, which was used as the Hotel Chevalier of the film's title and where all of the scenes were shot

Wes Anderson first approached Schwartzman and Portman about Hotel Chevalier in 2005. Schwartzman and Anderson had previously worked on Rushmore (1998), Anderson's cult second feature, and had been living together in Schwartzman's Paris apartment in the months leading up to the shoot. Portman was approached after the director obtained her email address from Scott Rudin, executive producer of 2004's Closer in which she starred. The actors appeared for free, and Anderson financed the remainder of the production himself.

It was filmed at the Hôtel Raphael in Paris, on Avenue Kléber, two blocks south-southwest of the Arc de Triomphe. The Hôtel Raphael had previously been used as a setting for the films Love in Paris (1996) and Place Vendôme (1998). It was shot by a crew of 15 in Panavision and used props from Anderson's apartment. Filming took two and a half days, and editing (done on Anderson's computer) another week. Despite his use of a wardrobe from prestigious fashion designer Marc Jacobs and a handmade suitcase from Louis Vuitton, the director described the production as "like making a student film".

Anderson initially intended it to be a stand-alone short film, but shortly before filming commenced, he realized that Jack (Schwartzman) bore a close resemblance to one of the protagonists of a feature film he was writing at the time. That film would begin production a year later as The Darjeeling Limited. Chevalier takes place two weeks before Jack joins his two older brothers on a journey in India in Darjeeling. The dialogue between the characters at the end of Chevalier is recounted by Jack to his brothers at the close of the feature film, in the form of an excerpt from a short story he has composed. Rhett (Portman) has a brief cameo in the feature. Fox Searchlight Pictures, the studio that backed Darjeeling, was unaware of the short until the feature had been made and claimed to have no financial interest in it.

== Release ==
When it was all done, I didn't want to incorporate the short into the movie. But I couldn't decide how I wanted it to go. I wanted to play the short in front of the movie, but not always. Sometimes I preferred to watch the movie without the short. It became a puzzle to me. So in the end I decided that I would like to have the movie open in America without the short, but I would like people to have access to it if they want to see it first.

— Wes Anderson, October 2007

Hotel Chevalier was screened as part of the program at the world première of The Darjeeling Limited at the 64th Venice International Film Festival on September 2, 2007. The short had its own première at Apple Stores in New York City, Chicago, San Francisco and Santa Monica, California, on September 25. Anderson, Schwartzman and Portman appeared at the New York screening in SoHo, after which they held a questions-and-answers session with the audience. The short was made available the following day as a free download from Apple's iTunes Store. On September 28, it preceded the showing of the feature on the opening night of the 2007 New York Film Festival. A press release posted before the première described the short as "the brief coda to a doomed romance and the prologue to The Darjeeling Limited".

The film was withdrawn from iTunes after having been available for download for a month. It had been dismissed by USA Today columnist Susan Wloszczyna before its iTunes release as an amuse-bouche that was "destined to be a mere footnote". It was downloaded nearly 500,000 times during its run, and received wide acclaim. Following its withdrawal from iTunes, the short was distributed in theaters as the prologue to the feature-length film. Although The New York Times reported in October 2007 that distributor Fox Searchlight Pictures intended to promote Chevalier as a competitor for the Best Live Action Short Film of the Academy Awards, it was not among that year's nominations. It was included as an extra feature on the Darjeeling 2008 DVD release, and Anderson's screenplay for the short was published in the Winter 2007 issue of the literary magazine Zoetrope: All-Story.

== Critical reception ==
Hotel Chevalier was one of the year's most discussed short films, and attracted considerable praise from film critics, who compared it favorably to The Darjeeling Limited. Gary Susman of Entertainment Weekly described it as "an exquisite short story where we learn not much but exactly enough about these two characters", adding that "Chevalier sees Anderson working in his customary jewel-box/dollhouse mode, but the form and length really suit each other here." Armond White of New York Press judged the short "moving and genuinely contemporary", citing its "lost-girl poignancy". The film drew some attention for Portman's brief, partial nude scene, and for her bruised body. Portman expressed disappointment at this undue focus, saying "[i]t really depressed me that half of every review ... was about the nudity". The episode made the actress reconsider the wisdom of this aspect of her performance, and she subsequently swore off nude appearances in film.

While The Darjeeling Limited did receive generally positive reviews—having attained a 68% approval rating on the review aggregator Rotten Tomatoes—many of the champions of Hotel Chevalier tended to combine praise of Chevalier with subtle shots at Darjeeling. Portman's performance as Rhett was praised by TIME reviewer Richard Corliss, who declared her to be "a comic actress in fresh bloom" in the "beguiling vignette", and expressed his wish that her role in Darjeeling had been greater. The feature, he felt, lacked "the feeling and wit of the short film". Stephanie Zacharek of Salon concurred, stating that "the untold story of Hotel Chevalier is 10 times more interesting, and infinitely richer, than the one told outright in The Darjeeling Limited", and calling the short "very close to perfect". The Guardian columnist Danny Leigh contrasted the lukewarm reception of the feature among bloggers and critics with the "genuine ardour" that greeted the "perfectly measured narrative" of Chevalier. He proposed that the constraints of the short-film format suited Anderson, whose trademark deadpan humor, idiosyncratic set designs and choice of soundtrack inclined to exhaust the viewers' patience in a feature-length work. A. O. Scott of The New York Times hailed Chevalier as "a small gem" in comparison to the "overstuffed suitcase" of the feature, and wrote that "It is worth seeking out, not only because it fleshes out part of the story of the Whitman brothers but also because, on its own, it is an almost perfect distillation of Mr. Anderson's vexing and intriguing talents, enigmatic, affecting and wry."
