= A Tale of Love and Darkness (film) =

2015 film

- Theatrical release poster
- סיפור על אהבה וחושך
- Directed by: Natalie Portman
- Screenplay by: Natalie Portman
- Based on: A Tale of Love and Darkness by Amos Oz
- Produced by: Ram Bergman; David Mandil
- Starring: Natalie Portman; Gilad Kahana; Amir Tessler
- Cinematography: Sławomir Idziak
- Edited by: Andrew Mondshein
- Music by: Nicholas Britell
- Production companies: Voltage Pictures; Black Bicycle Entertainment; Ram Bergman Productions; MoviePlus Productions
- Distributed by: United King Films (Israel); Focus World (United States)
- Release dates: May 16, 2015 (Cannes); September 3, 2015 (Israel); August 19, 2016 (United States)
- Running time: 95 minutes
- Countries: Israel; United States
- Languages: Hebrew; English
- Budget: $4.2 million
- Box office: $572,212 (United States); ₪1,766,357 (Israel)

A Tale of Love and Darkness (Hebrew: סיפור על אהבה וחושך, pronounced [sipuʁ al ahava vaxo∫ex]) is a 2015 drama film written and directed by Natalie Portman in her directorial feature debut. Based on the memoir of the same name by Israeli author Amos Oz, it takes place in Jerusalem in the last years of Mandatory Palestine and the first years of independent Israel. It stars Amir Tessler as Oz, and Gilad Kahana and Portman as his parents. It was screened at the 2015 Cannes Film Festival and in the Special Presentations section of the 2015 Toronto International Film Festival.

== Plot ==
Amos reflects on his early childhood in British Mandate of Palestine (now Israel) with his mother Fania and father Arieh. His parents are Ashkenazi Jews who have immigrated from Europe to Jerusalem. Amos's mother finds life difficult because Jerusalem is a desert, because her family lives in Tel Aviv, and because communication with them is difficult. Amos, an only child, is particularly close to his mother, who frequently tells him stories based on her childhood that often have unhappy or violent endings.

Amos's parents regularly lend him out to a childless couple they are friends with. On one occasion this couple takes him to visit a friend of theirs, a Palestinian Arab. They warn Amos to be quiet and not make much fuss lest he offend their hosts, but while playing with a swing he accidentally injures the Arab's little son. Terrified, Amos's father calls the injured boy's father and promises to pay all of the hospital fees.

On November 29, 1947, Amos' family and others from the neighbourhood gather around a radio in the street to hear the passing of United Nations General Assembly Resolution 181, which adopted a plan to partition Mandatory Palestine into independent Arab and Jewish states. Amos' parents are overwhelmed with joy. His father tells him how savagely his grandfather was treated by anti-Semites in Europe and how, now that the Jewish people have a country of their own, that anti-Semitism will disappear forever. Arieh tells Amos that while he may be bullied someday for being an intellectual, no one will ever mistreat him for being a Jew.

Soon afterward, civil war erupts between Arabs and Jews in Palestine. Amos' father enlists to fight in the war, while Amos and other children are recruited to gather bottles for 'cocktails' and bags for sand for the war effort. One of Fania's friends is killed by a Palestinian sniper while she is hanging up her family's laundry.

Although the war soon ends in defeat for the Arabs, Fania falls into major depression and becomes unable to sleep or eat. Amos and Arieh try their best to hide her depression from their friends and family. While taking anti-depressants, Fania abruptly becomes her former, more lively self and begins to act normally with her husband and son. During a meal at a restaurant, however, she relapses once more. Saying that he doesn't know how to help her, Arieh sends Fania to her sisters in Tel Aviv. Despite her sisters' efforts to lift her spirits, Fania commits suicide by a deliberate overdose in 1952. In voiceover, Amos expresses a belief that his mother felt so much pain that she had come to see death as a lover with whom she longed to unite herself.

Years later, Amos goes to live on a kibbutz, where he works to fulfill his mother's dream of making the desert bloom. During a visit from his father, a teenaged Amos shows off his new life but admits that despite his attempts at being a strong and healthy farmer, he is still a pale and weak intellectual.

Decades later, an elderly Amos Oz sits down to write his memoirs, beginning with the word, "Mother".

== Cast ==
- Natalie Portman as Fania Klausner née Mussman
- Gilad Kahana as Arieh Klausner
- Amir Tessler as Amos Klausner (child)
- Makram Khoury as Halawani
- Yonatan Shiray as Amos Klausner/Oz (teenager)
- Shira Haas as Fania Mussman (young) / Kira
- Tomer Kapon as The Pioneer
- Neta Riskin as Haya

== Production ==
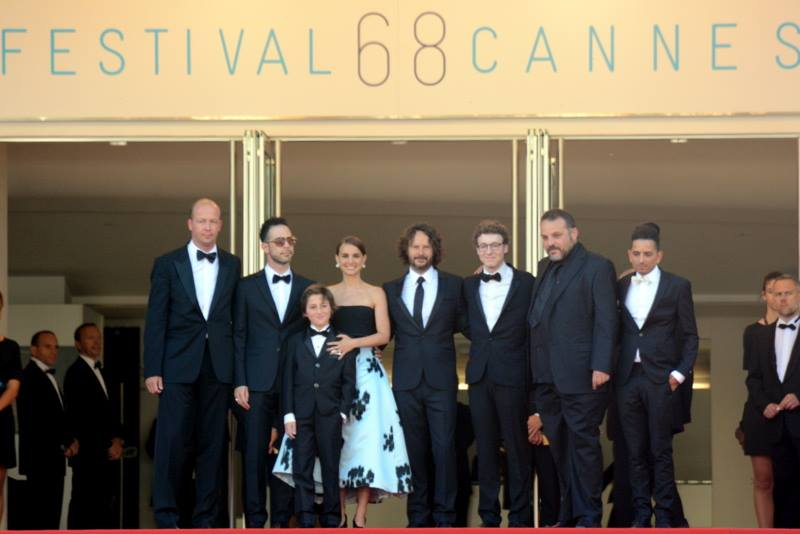
Director, producer, and cast at the 2015 Cannes Film Festival.

According to Portman, she optioned the rights to the book over tea, while visiting with Oz and his wife. It took her eight years to write the script and find funding, during which time she insisted that the adaptation remain in Hebrew.

It is the second film in which Portman speaks Hebrew. In order to play the role of Amos Oz's mother, an immigrant from what is now Ukraine, Portman made considerable efforts to remove all traces of an American accent from her Hebrew.

Portman recruited designer Alber Elbaz to design the costumes she wore in the film.

The film’s modest $4.2 million budget was partially funded by the right-leaning Israeli government, which has an interest in promoting Israel as a filming location for international productions and countering pro-Palestinian boycott efforts. Portman said the film was "absolutely not" pro-Israeli or patriotic and that she was "very much against" Israeli Prime Minister Benjamin Netanyahu. The film also touches on the dispossession of Palestinians resulting from the 1948 war during Israel's founding phase.

In March 2016, Focus World acquired the rights to distribute a theatrical release of the film in the United States.

== Reception ==
On review aggregator website Rotten Tomatoes, 72% out of 67 film critics gave the film a positive review . The website's critical consensus reads, "A Tale of Love and Darkness suggests greater things for debuting writer-director Natalie Portman — even if its reach slightly exceeds her creative grasp." Critical aggregator website Metacritic awarded the film a score of 55, indicating "mixed or average" reviews.
