= V for Vendetta =

Graphic novel by Alan Moore and David Lloyd

- V for Vendetta collected edition cover art by David Lloyd
- Publisher: United Kingdom; Quality Communications; United States; Vertigo (DC Comics) France; Delcourt; Brazil; Abril Jovem; Panini Comics

Creative team
- Writer: Alan Moore
- Artists: David Lloyd; Tony Weare
- Letterer: Steve Craddock
- Colourist: Steve Whitaker; Siobhan Dodds; David Lloyd
- Editors: Dez Skinn; Karen Berger; Scott Nybakken

Original publication
- Issues: 10
- Date of publication: March 1982 – May 1989
- ISBN: 0-930289-52-8

V for Vendetta is a British graphic novel written by Alan Moore and illustrated by David Lloyd (with additional art by Tony Weare). Initially published between 1982 and 1985 in black and white as an ongoing serial in the British anthology Warrior, its serialisation was completed in 1988–89 in a ten-issue colour limited series published by DC Comics in the United States. Subsequent collected editions were typically published under DC's specialised imprint, Vertigo, until that label was shut down in 2018. Since then it has been transferred to DC Black Label. The story depicts a dystopian and post-apocalyptic near-future history version of the United Kingdom in the 1990s, preceded by a nuclear war in the 1980s that devastated most of the rest of the world. The Nordic supremacist, neo-fascist, outwardly Christofascist, and homophobic fictional Norsefire political party has exterminated its opponents in concentration camps, and it now rules the country as a police state.

The comics follow the story's title character and protagonist, V, an anarchist revolutionary wearing a Guy Fawkes mask, as he begins an elaborate and theatrical revolutionist campaign to kill his former captors and torturers, bring down the fascist state, and convince the people to abandon fascism in favour of anarchy, while inspiring a young woman, Evey Hammond, to be his protégée.

DC Comics had sold more than 500,000 copies of the graphic novel in the United States by 2006. Warner Bros. released a film adaptation of the same name, written and co-produced by the Wachowskis, (Note: Credited as The Wachowski Brothers) in 2005. Following the first and second season premieres of Gotham prequel television series Pennyworth in 2019 and 2020, showrunners Danny Cannon and Bruno Heller confirmed the series would also serve as a prequel to V for Vendetta, with the series' British Civil War eventually giving way to the Norsefire government and rise of V, and the third season featuring predecessors to V wearing Guy Fawkes masks.

== Publication history ==
Structure and publishing history of V for Vendetta
Book	Chapter	Warrior	DC (Note: TPB collection first published by Warner Books in May 1990, ISBN 0-446-39190-5. Includes new foreword from David Lloyd (Jan 1990).)
1: Europe After the Reign	1: The Villain	#1; Mar 1982	#1; Sep 1988
1: Europe After the Reign	2: The Voice	#2; Apr 1982	#1; Sep 1988
1: Europe After the Reign	3: Victims	#3; Jul 1982	#1; Sep 1988
1: Europe After the Reign	4: Vaudeville	#4; Jul 1982	#1; Sep 1988
1: Europe After the Reign	5: Versions	#5 (Note: Warrior #5 includes the vignette "Vertigo".); Sep 1982	#2; Oct 1988
1: Europe After the Reign	6: The Vision	#6; Oct 1982	#2; Oct 1988
1: Europe After the Reign	7: Virtue Victorious	#7; Nov 1982	#2; Oct 1988
1: Europe After the Reign	8: The Valley	#8; Dec 1982	#2; Oct 1988
1: Europe After the Reign	9: Violence	#9; Jan 1983	#3; Nov 1988
1: Europe After the Reign	10: Venom	#10; Apr 1983	#3; Nov 1988
1: Europe After the Reign	11: The Vortex	#11; Jul 1983	#3; Nov 1988
2: This Vicious Cabaret	Prelude	#12; Aug 1983	#4; Dec 1988
2: This Vicious Cabaret	1: The Vanishing	#13; Sep 1983	#4; Dec 1988
2: This Vicious Cabaret	2: The Veil	#14; Oct 1983	#4; Dec 1988
2: This Vicious Cabaret	3: Video	#15; Nov 1983	#4; Dec 1988
2: This Vicious Cabaret	4: A Vocational Viewpoint	#16; Dec 1983	#5; Dec 1988
2: This Vicious Cabaret	5: The Vacation	#18 (Note: Warrior #17 (Mar 1984) includes "Behind the Painted Smile" by Alan Moore, but no comic.); Apr 1984	#5; Dec 1988
2: This Vicious Cabaret	6: Variety	#19; Jun 1984	#5; Dec 1988
2: This Vicious Cabaret	7: Visitors	#21 (Note: Warrior #20 (Jul 1984) includes the vignette "Vincent".); Aug 1984	#5; Dec 1988
2: This Vicious Cabaret	8: Vengeance	#22; Sep 1984	#6; Dec 1988
2: This Vicious Cabaret	9: Vicissitude	#23; Oct 1984	#6; Dec 1988
2: This Vicious Cabaret	10: Vermin	#24; Nov 1984	#6; Dec 1988
2: This Vicious Cabaret	11: Valerie	#25; Dec 1984	#6; Dec 1988
2: This Vicious Cabaret	12: The Verdict	#26; Feb 1985	#7 (Note: Includes the interludes "Vertigo" and "Vincent"); Jan 1989
2: This Vicious Cabaret	13: Values	#27 (unpublished)	#7; Jan 1989
2: This Vicious Cabaret	14: Vignettes	#28 (unpublished)	#7; Jan 1989
3: The Land of Do-As-You-Please	Prologue	—	#8; Feb 1989
3: The Land of Do-As-You-Please	1: Vox Populi	—	#8; Feb 1989
3: The Land of Do-As-You-Please	2: Verwirrung	—	#8; Feb 1989
3: The Land of Do-As-You-Please	3: Various Valentines	—	#8; Feb 1989
3: The Land of Do-As-You-Please	4: Vestiges	—	#9; Mar 1989
3: The Land of Do-As-You-Please	V: The Valediction	—	#9; Mar 1989
3: The Land of Do-As-You-Please	6: Vectors	—	#9; Mar 1989
3: The Land of Do-As-You-Please	7: Vindication	—	#9; Mar 1989
3: The Land of Do-As-You-Please	8: Vultures	—	#10; May 1989
3: The Land of Do-As-You-Please	9: The Vigil	—	#10; May 1989
3: The Land of Do-As-You-Please	10: The Volcano	—	#10; May 1989
3: The Land of Do-As-You-Please	11: Valhalla	—	#10; May 1989
Notes

The first episodes of V for Vendetta appeared in black-and-white between 1982 and 1985 in Warrior, a British anthology comic published by Quality Communications. Editor/publisher Dez Skinn, fearing about the appeal of the strip remarked, "If I'd have given each character their own title, the failures would have certainly outweighed the successes, with the uncompromising 'V for Vendetta' probably being an early casualty. But with five or six strips an issue, regular [readers] only needed two or three favorites to justify their buying the title."

When the publishers cancelled Warrior in 1985 (with two completed issues unpublished due to the cancellation), several companies attempted to convince Moore and Lloyd to let them publish and complete the story. In 1988, DC Comics published a ten-issue series that reprinted the Warrior stories in colour, then continued the series to completion. The first new material appeared in issue No. 7, which included the unpublished episodes that would have appeared in Warrior No. 27 and No. 28. Tony Weare drew one chapter ("Vincent") and contributed additional art to two others ("Valerie" and "The Vacation"); Steve Whitaker and Siobhan Dodds worked as colourists on the entire series.

=== Collected editions ===
The series has appeared collected in paperback (ISBN 0-446-39190-5) and hardback (ISBN 1-4012-0792-8) form, including Moore's "Behind the Painted Smile" essay and two "interludes" outside the central continuity. Later collections include reissued paperbacks, published in the US by DC's Vertigo imprint (ISBN 0-930289-52-8) and in the UK by Titan Books (ISBN 1-85286-291-2). A new hardback edition was published in 2005 featuring improved printing and colouring. In August 2009, DC published a slipcased Absolute Edition (ISBN 1-4012-2361-3), which included newly coloured "silent art" pages (full-page panels containing no dialogue) from the series' original run, which had not previously appeared in any previous collected edition.

- — — (24 October 2008). V for Vendetta (New TPB ed.). DC Vertigo. ISBN 9781401208417.
- — — (24 December 2008). V for Vendetta (New ed.). DC Vertigo.
- — — (8 September 2009). V for Vendetta (Absolute ed.). DC Vertigo. ISBN 9781401223618.
- — — (9 October 2012). V for Vendetta (Deluxe Collector Set ed.). DC Vertigo. ISBN 9781401238582.
- — — (20 November 2018). V for Vendetta (The 30th Anniversary Deluxe ed.). DC Vertigo. ISBN 9781401285005.
- — — (4 November 2025). V for Vendetta (DC Compact Comics ed.). DC Comics. ISBN 9781799503132.

=== Background ===
Cover of Warrior #19, highlighting the comic's conflict between anarchist and fascist philosophies.

David Lloyd's paintings for V for Vendetta in Warrior first appeared in black and white. In writing V for Vendetta, Moore drew upon a comic strip idea submission that the DC Thomson scriptwriting competition rejected in 1975: "The Doll", which involved a transgender terrorist in white face makeup, who fought a totalitarian state during the 1980s.

Years later, Skinn reportedly invited Moore to create a dark mystery strip with artist David Lloyd. V for Vendetta was intended to recreate something similar to their popular Marvel UK Night Raven strip in a 1930s noir. They chose against doing historical research and instead set the story in the near future rather than the recent past.

Then V for Vendetta emerged, putting the emphasis on "V" rather than "Vendetta". David Lloyd developed the idea of dressing V as Guy Fawkes after previous designs followed the conventional superhero look. During the preparation of the story, Moore made a list of what he wanted to bring into the plot, which he reproduced in "Behind the Painted Smile":

Orwell. Huxley. Thomas Disch. Judge Dredd. Harlan Ellison's "Repent, Harlequin!" Said the Ticktockman, Catman and The Prowler in the City at the Edge of the World by the same author. Vincent Price's Dr. Phibes and Theatre of Blood. David Bowie. The Shadow. Night Raven. Batman. Fahrenheit 451. The writings of the New Worlds school of science fiction. Max Ernst's painting "Europe After the Rain". Thomas Pynchon. The atmosphere of British Second World War films. The Prisoner. Robin Hood. Dick Turpin...

The influence of such a wide number of references has been thoroughly demonstrated in academic studies, above which dystopian elements stand out, especially the similarity with George Orwell's Nineteen Eighty-Four in several stages of the plot.

The political climate of Britain in the early 1980s also influenced the work, with Moore positing that Margaret Thatcher's Conservative government would "obviously lose the 1983 elections", and that an incoming Michael Foot-led Labour government, committed to complete nuclear disarmament, would allow the United Kingdom to escape relatively unscathed after a limited nuclear war. However, Moore felt that fascists would quickly subvert a post-nuclear holocaust Britain. V, an anarchist, initially tortures and murders members of the fascist government, but as the story develops, Moore deliberately made V's actions "very, very morally ambiguous" with the aim that "I didn't want to tell people what to think, I just wanted to tell people to think." The Guy Fawkes analogy was deliberate, with Moore pointing out in a 2012 interview that Britain has a history of "making heroes out of criminals or people who in other centuries might have been regarded as terrorists", desiring a similar ambiguity for a protagonist reviled as a villain by the Britain of his fictional 1990s.

Moore's scenario remains untested. Addressing historical developments when DC reissued the work, he noted:

Naïveté can also be detected in my supposition that it would take something as melodramatic as a near-miss nuclear conflict to nudge Britain towards fascism... The simple fact that much of the historical background of the story proceeds from a predicted Conservative defeat in the 1983 General Election should tell you how reliable we were in our roles as Cassandras.

== Plot ==
=== Book 1: Europe After the Reign ===
On Guy Fawkes Night in London in 1997, financially desperate 16-year-old Evey Hammond accidentally sexually solicits men who are actually members of the state secret police called "The Finger". Preparing to rape and kill her, the Fingermen are dispatched by V, a cloaked anarchist wearing a mask, who later remotely detonates explosives at the Palace of Westminster before bringing Evey to his contraband-filled underground lair, the "Shadow Gallery." Evey tells V her life story, which reveals her own past and England's recent history. During a dispute “over Poland” in the late 1980s, the Soviet Union and the United States, under the presidency of Ted Kennedy, entered a global nuclear war which left continental Europe and Africa uninhabitable. Although Britain itself was not bombed due to the Labour government's decision to remove American nuclear missiles, it faced environmental devastation and famine due to the nuclear winter. After a period of lawlessness in which Evey's mother died, the remaining corporations and fascist groups took over Britain and formed a new totalitarian government, Norsefire. Evey's father, a former socialist, was arrested by the regime.

Meanwhile, Eric Finch, a veteran detective in charge of the regular police force ("The Nose"), begins investigating V's terrorist activities. Finch often communicates with the other top government officials, collectively known as "The Head." These individuals include Derek Almond, who supervises the Finger (and who is both emotionally and physically abusive to his wife), and Adam Susan, the reclusive Leader of Norsefire, who obsessively oversees the government's Fate computer system. Finch's case thickens when V kidnaps Lewis Prothero, a propaganda-broadcasting radio personality, and drives him into a mental breakdown by forcing him to relive his actions as the commander of a "resettlement" camp near Larkhill with his treasured doll collection as inmates. Evey agrees to help V with the next part of his plan (not knowing that it will be an assassination) by disguising herself as a child prostitute to help V infiltrate the residence of Bishop Anthony Lilliman, a paedophile priest, whom V forces to commit suicide by eating a poisoned communion wafer. He prepares to murder Dr. Delia Surridge, a medical researcher who once had a relationship with Finch. Finch suddenly discovers the connection among V's three targets: they all used to work at Larkhill, and warns Almond. That night after confronting Surridge in her bedroom, V kills her with a painless poison; when Almond appears as V is leaving and tries to shoot him (with what turns out to be an unloaded gun), V kills him too. Surridge leaves a diary revealing that V—a former inmate and victim of Surridge's cruel medical experiments—destroyed and fled the camp and is now eliminating the camp's former personnel for what they did. Finch reports these findings to Susan, and suspects that this vendetta may actually be a cover for V, who, he worries, may be plotting an even bigger terrorist attack.

=== Book 2: This Vicious Cabaret ===
Four months later, V breaks into Jordan Tower, the home of Norsefire's propaganda department, "the Mouth"—led by Roger Dascombe—to broadcast a recorded speech that calls on the people to resist the government. V escapes using an elaborate diversion that results in Dascombe's death. Finch is soon introduced to Peter Creedy, the Finger's new head, who provokes Finch to strike him and thus get sent on forced leave. Evey, who has been returned by V to the outside world, takes shelter at the house of a man named Gordon, who found her on the street. While originally platonic, they eventually build a romantic relationship. Evey and Gordon unknowingly cross paths with Rose Almond, the widow of the recently killed Derek. After Derek's death, Rose had reluctantly begun a relationship with Dascombe. With her husband and lover dead, she is cut off from government benefits and has been forced to get a job performing demoralising burlesque work, increasing her hatred of the unsupportive government.

When a Scottish gangster named Ally Harper murders Gordon, a vengeful Evey tracks Harper to a meeting between him and Creedy, who is buying the support of Harper's thugs in preparation for a coup d'état. From a nearby alley, Evey attempts to shoot Harper but is suddenly abducted and later awakens to find herself in a prison cell. Amidst interrogation, humiliation and torture, Evey finds an old letter hidden in her cell by an inmate named Valerie Page, a film actress who was imprisoned for being a lesbian and subjected to medical experimentation, and who had documented her life story in the letter.

Evey's interrogator eventually gives her a final choice: collaboration or death; inspired by Valerie's letter, Evey refuses to collaborate and, expecting to be executed, is instead told that she is free. Stunned, Evey learns that her supposed imprisonment has in reality been an elaborate charade constructed by V so that she could experience an ordeal similar to the one that shaped him at Larkhill. He reveals that the letter is not a fake and that Valerie really existed, that she was a Larkhill prisoner who had died in the cell next to his. Evey forgives V, who reveals he had long ago hacked into the government's Fate computer system and begun emotionally manipulating Adam Susan with mind games. Consequently, Susan, who has formed a bizarre romantic attachment to the computer, begins to descend into madness.

=== Book 3: The Land of Do-As-You-Please ===
The following 5 November (1998), V blows up both the Post Office Tower and Jordan Tower, killing "the Ear" leader Brian Etheridge and effectively shutting down three government agencies: the Eye, the Ear, and the Mouth. Creedy's men and Harper's associated street gangs violently suppress the subsequent wave of revolutionary fervor from the public. V notes to Evey that he has not yet achieved what he calls "The Land of Do-As-You-Please," meaning a functional anarchistic society, and considers the current chaotic situation an interim period of "The Land of Take-What-You-Want." Finch has been mysteriously absent, and his young assistant, Dominic Stone, one day realises that V has been influencing the Fate computer all along, which explained V's consistent foresight. In the meantime, Finch travels to the abandoned site of Larkhill near Salisbury Plain, where he takes LSD to conjure up memories of his own devastating past and to put his mind in the role of a prisoner of Larkhill, like V, to help give him an intuitive understanding of V's experiences. Returning to London, Finch suddenly deduces that V's lair is inside the abandoned Victoria Station, which he enters.

V takes Finch by surprise, resulting in a scuffle that sees Finch shoot V and V wounding Finch with a knife. V claims that he cannot be killed since he is only an idea and that "ideas are bulletproof"; regardless, V is indeed mortally wounded and returns to the Shadow Gallery deeper within, dying in Evey's arms. Evey considers unmasking V but decides not to, realising that V is not an identity but a symbol. She then assumes V's identity, donning one of his spare costumes and masks. Finch sees the large amount of blood that V has left in his wake and deduces that he has mortally wounded V. Occurring concurrently to this, Creedy has been pressuring Susan to appear in public, hoping to leave him exposed. Sure enough, as Susan stops to shake hands with Rose during a parade, she shoots him in the head in vengeance for the death of her husband and the life she has had to lead since then. Following Rose's arrest, Creedy assumes emergency leadership of the country, and Finch emerges from the subway proclaiming V's death.

Due to his LSD-induced epiphany, Finch leaves his position within "the Nose." The power struggle between the remaining leaders results in all of their deaths: Harper betrays and kills Creedy at the behest of Helen Heyer (wife of "the Eye" leader Conrad Heyer and who had outbid Creedy for Harper's loyalty), and Harper and Conrad Heyer kill each other during a fight precipitated by Heyer's discovery (via a videotape sent by V) that Helen had had an affair with Harper.

With the fate of the top government officials unknown to the public, Stone acts as leader of the police forces deployed to ensure that the riots are contained should V remain alive and make his promised public announcement. Evey, dressed as V, appears on a rooftop to a crowd, announcing the destruction of 10 Downing Street the following day and telling the crowd they must "...choose what comes next. Lives of your own, or a return to chains", whereupon a general insurrection begins. Evey destroys 10 Downing Street by blowing up an Underground train containing V's body in the style of an explosive Viking funeral. During the chaos in the streets, she abducts an injured Stone and brings him to the Shadow Gallery, apparently to train him as her successor to make sure people like Susan will never hold power ever again. The comic ends with Finch quietly observing the chaos raging in the city, spurning Helen Heyer's proposal to become her partner and seize power, and walking down an abandoned motorway whose lights have all gone out.

=== Norsefire government ===
The highest-level officials in the Norsefire government form a council known as "The Head." The five individual departments are named after sensory organs or appendages that reference their functions.

Norsefire government officials in V for Vendetta
Branch	Head	Eye	Ear	Nose	Finger	Mouth
Function	Leadership	Video Surveillance	Audio Surveillance	Investigative (New Scotland Yard)	Executive (Secret Police)	Propaganda (Note: The Voice of Fate as broadcast by the Mouth was provided by Lewis Prothero, former commander of Larkhill Resettlement Camp, driven incurably insane by V in Book 1, Chapter 5.)
Leader	Adam James Susan (Note: Shot by Rosemary Almond.)	Conrad Heyer (Note: Abandoned by Helen Heyer to exsanguinate following struggle with Ally Harper, gangster from Scotland.)	Brian 'Bunny' Etheridge (Note: Dies in explosion of Post Office Tower.)	Eric Finch (Note: Assisted by Dominic Stone, who fills as leader of The Nose in for Finch during the latter's forced holiday after Finch was goaded into striking Peter Creedy.)	Derek Almond (Note: Stabbed by V when confronted at Dr. Surridge's apartment.)	Roger Dascombe (Note: Shot by Fingermen as a decoy.)
Leader	Adam James Susan	Conrad Heyer	Brian 'Bunny' Etheridge	Eric Finch	Peter Creedy (Note: Temporarily elevated to Emergency Commander in the wake of Susan's death.) (Note: Killed by Ally Harper using a straight razor.)	Roger Dascombe
Partner	Fate (Note: As explained in Bk 1 Ch 5.)	Helen Heyer (Note: Abandoned by Finch to "louts" at the conclusion of Bk 3 Ch 11.)	Mrs. Etheridge	Delia Anne Surridge (Note: Medical researcher at Larkhill. Poisoned by V in Bk 1 Ch 10.)	Rosemary Almond	— (Note: Dascombe pressures the widowed Rosemary Almond into a relationship.)
Dies	Bk 3 Ch 7	Bk 3 Ch 10	Bk 3 Prologue	—	(Almond) Bk 1 Ch 10	Bk 2 Ch 4
Dies	Bk 3 Ch 7	Bk 3 Ch 10	Bk 3 Prologue	—	(Creedy) Bk 3 Ch 8	Bk 2 Ch 4

== Themes and motifs ==
David Lloyd briefly discussing V for Vendetta in 2011

The two conflicting political viewpoints of anarchism and fascism dominate the story. Moore stated in an interview that V is designed as an enigma, as Moore "didn't want to tell people what to think" but wanted them to consider some extreme events that have recurred throughout history.

== Adaptations ==
=== Film ===
In March 2006 Warner Bros. released a feature-film adaptation of V for Vendetta, directed by James McTeigue from a screenplay by the Wachowskis, with Natalie Portman starring as Evey Hammond and Hugo Weaving appearing as V. Moore distanced himself from the film, as he has with other screen adaptations of his works. He ended co-operation with his publisher, DC Comics, after its corporate parent, Warner Bros., failed to retract statements about Moore's supposed endorsement of the movie. After reading the script, Moore remarked:

[The movie] has been turned into a Bush-era parable by people too timid to set a political satire in their own country. ... It's a thwarted and frustrated and largely impotent American liberal fantasy of someone with American liberal values standing up against a state run by neoconservatives – which is not what the comic V for Vendetta was about. It was about fascism, it was about anarchy, it was about England.

He later added that if the Wachowskis had wanted to protest about what was going on in the United States, then they should have used a political narrative that directly addressed such issues, similar to what Moore had done before with Britain. The film arguably changes the original message by having removed any reference to actual anarchism in the revolutionary actions of V. An interview with producer Joel Silver reveals that he identifies the V of the comics as a clear-cut "superhero... a masked avenger who pretty much saves the world", a simplification that goes against Moore's own statements about V's role in the story. Co-author and illustrator David Lloyd, by contrast, embraced the adaptation. In an interview with Newsarama, he states:

It's a terrific film. The most extraordinary thing about it for me was seeing scenes that I'd worked on and crafted for maximum effect in the book translated to film with the same degree of care and effect. The "transformation" scene between Natalie Portman and Hugo Weaving is just great. If you happen to be one of those people who admires the original so much that changes to it will automatically turn you off, then you may dislike the film—but if you enjoyed the original and can accept an adaptation that is different to its source material but equally as powerful, then you'll be as impressed as I was with it.

Steve Moore (no relation to Alan Moore) wrote a novelisation of the film's screenplay, published in 2006.

=== Television ===
In October 2017, it was announced that Channel 4 was developing a television series based on the V for Vendetta comic book, which ultimately entered development hell. In November 2025, a television series adaptation of the graphic novel was revealed to be in development for HBO, with Pete Jackson writing and DC Studios co-chiefs James Gunn and Peter Safran producing.

In July 2019, the day following the series premiere of Pennyworth, previously presented as a direct prequel to Fox series Gotham (2014–2019), series co-showrunner Danny Cannon confirmed that Pennyworth would also serve as a loose prequel to V for Vendetta, with the British Civil War depicted in the first season (2019) eventually leading to the formation of the Norsefire government of V for Vendetta, a sentiment echoed by co-showrunner Bruno Heller in December 2020 and February 2021. Characters wearing V's Guy Fawkes mask were later introduced in the third season (2022), set five years after the first two seasons.

== Legacy ==
The February 1999 issue of The Comics Journal ran a poll on "The Top 100 (English-Language) Comics of the Century": V for Vendetta reached 83rd place. On 5 November 2019, the BBC News listed V for Vendetta on its list of the 100 most influential novels.

== Cultural impact ==
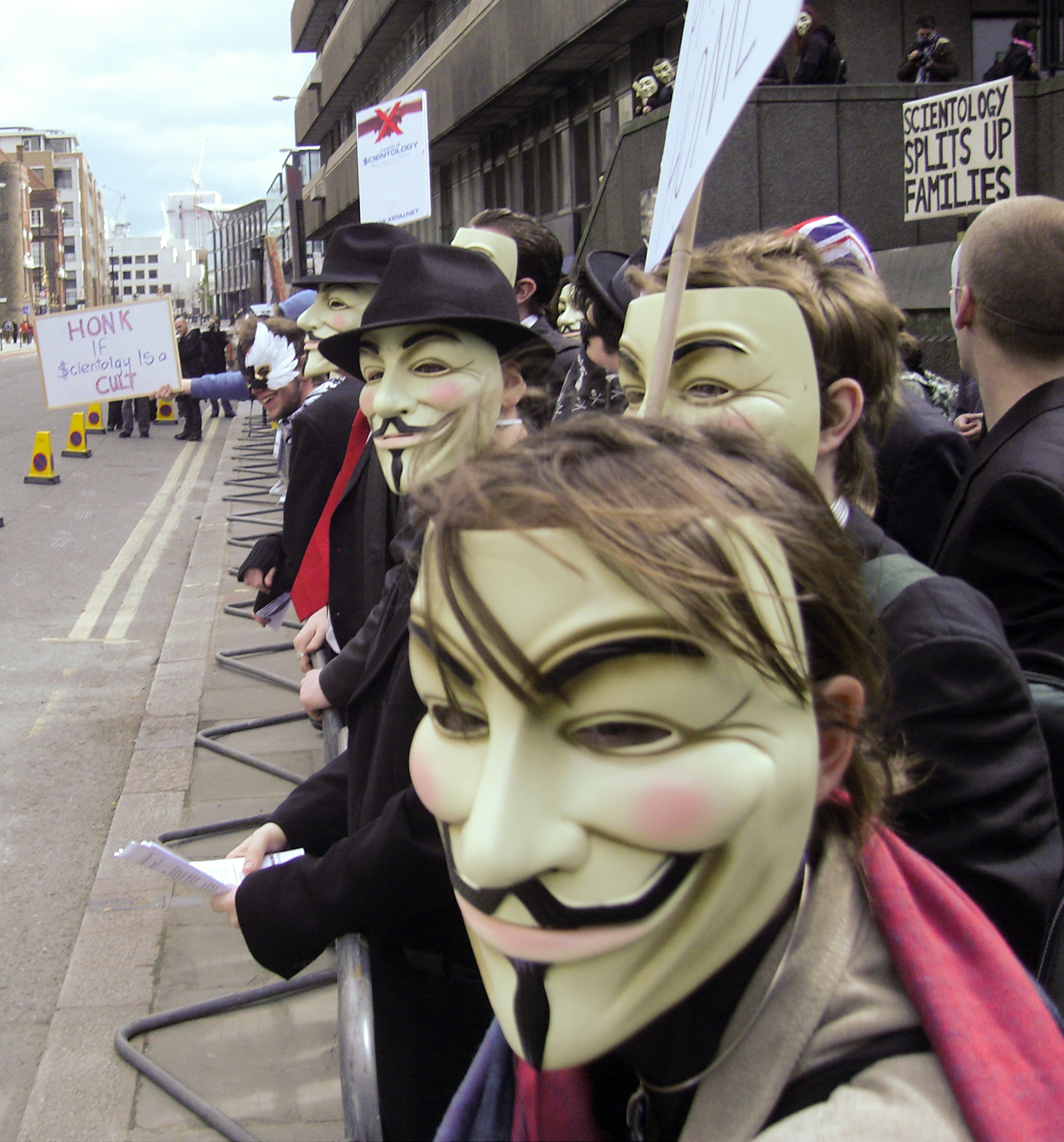
Protesters wearing Guy Fawkes masks at a protest against Scientology in London in 2008

Since the film adaptation, hundreds of thousands of Guy Fawkes masks from the books and film have been sold every year since the film's release in 2005. Time Warner owns the rights to the image and is paid a fee with the sale of each official mask.

Anonymous, an online group associated with computer hacking, popularised the mask as a symbol for rebellion by wearing it at protests against governments. It prominently featured in the 2008 Project Chanology protests against the Church of Scientology. Moore described being pleased by the Fawkes mask's appearance at the protests. According to Time in 2011, the protesters' adoption of the mask led to it becoming the top-selling mask on Amazon, selling hundreds of thousands a year. The film allegedly inspired some of the Egyptian youth before and during the 2011 Egyptian revolution.

On 23 May 2009, protesters dressed up as V and set off a fake barrel of gunpowder outside Parliament while protesting over the issue of British MPs' expenses. During the Occupy Wall Street and other Occupy protests, the mask appeared internationally as a symbol of popular revolution. Artist David Lloyd stated: "The Guy Fawkes mask has now become a common brand and a convenient placard to use in protest against tyranny—and I'm happy with people using it, it seems quite unique, an icon of popular culture being used this way."

On 17 November 2012, police officials in Dubai warned against wearing Guy Fawkes masks painted with the colours of the UAE flag during any celebration associated with the UAE National Day (2 December), declaring such use an illegal act after masks went on sale in online shops for 50 DHS. Guy Fawkes masks also made an appearance in the 2014 Hong Kong protests, and again in 2019.

== See also ==
- Anarky
- Watchmen

== Bibliography ==
- Moore, Alan (1995) [1st pub. 1983]. "Behind the Painted Smile". V for Vendetta. New York: Vertigo. pp. 267–276. ISBN 0-930289-52-8.
