= Evey Hammond =

Fictional character

- Evey Hammond as depicted in V for Vendetta, by Alan Moore & David Lloyd

Publication information
- Publisher: Vertigo imprint of DC Comics (originally Quality Communications)
- First appearance: Warrior #1 (Mar. 1982)
- Created by: Alan Moore; David Lloyd; Tony Weare

In-story information
- Partnerships: V Eric Finch (husband; film only) (Note: In a brief flashforward sequence showing events from the ending and beyond of V for Vendetta, presented as Eric Finch's vision of "how the story will end", shortly before the third act, a brief shot shows Finch and Evey Hammond to have married some time after the events of the film.)
- Notable aliases: Eve; V E-V (film only)

Evey Hammond is a fictional character of the comic book series V for Vendetta, created by Alan Moore, David Lloyd, and Tony Weare. She becomes involved in V's life when he rescues her from a gang of London's secret police, ultimately succeeding him as V. Evey made her first live-action appearance in the 2005 film V for Vendetta played by Natalie Portman.

== Biography ==
Born September 1981, Evey grew up on Shooters Hill in south-east London. As a child, she lost both her parents: her mother died following a nuclear war in the early 1980s and her father was arrested and executed by Norsefire, the fascist dictatorship that seized authority during the war's aftermath, because of his socialist political leanings. Sent to a youth hostel: she is forced to work packing matches into boxes for shipment and then begins working at a munitions factory.

Struck by poverty, Evey tries to become a prostitute. The first potential customer she approaches turns out to be a Fingerman, a member of Norsefire's secret police, working on a vice squad sting operation. As the man and his associates are about to rape her, she is saved by a mysterious man in a Guy Fawkes mask and black cloak who calls himself "V." V lets Evey watch him blow up the Houses of Parliament.

V takes Evey to his underground hideout, which he refers to as "The Shadow Gallery." He blindfolds her so she cannot see where they were going. Evey comes to confide in V, telling him about the death of her parents. V comforts her and she becomes dependent on him for safety and security. When Evey offers to repay V's kindness, he dresses her up as a young girl and sends her to distract Anthony James Lilliman, a paedophile bishop and Norsefire official whom he has targeted for revenge. Evey is stricken with guilt over her complicity in the bishop's assassination, with her realizing that V is far more sinister than she suspected.

When Evey finds herself abandoned by V and alone in the streets, she is taken in by an older man, Gordon Deitrich, who is involved in organized crime and later becomes her lover. When Gordon is murdered by Alistair Harper, a Scottish rival gangster, Evey tries to take revenge, but is herself captured by a Fingerman on the belief that she was going to kill Commander Peter Creedy of the Finger. She is thrown in prison and tortured by the police, who know of her connection to V. Inside her cell, Evey is passed a letter from the adjoining cell, written by a woman named Valerie Page. The letter is the story of Valerie's life, from her first love to her film career to her imprisonment for being a lesbian. Valerie's tragic death and firm resolve inspire Evey to resist the interrogations. When Evey says that she would rather die than surrender her integrity by informing on V, she is surprisingly set free from her cell.

Evey soon learns that her imprisonment and torture was all staged by V, putting her through the same experiences that shaped him. Initially furious, Evey comes to understand and accept her identity and freedom. However, the inspiring letter was not fake; it had been given to V by Valerie when he was an inmate at the Larkhill Resettlement camp, a concentration camp run by Norsefire to eliminate those considered "inferior" (Jews, Blacks, Muslims, homosexuals, etc.) under Chancellor Adam Sutler's fascist world view.

After V exacts his revenge on all of his former torturers, he is mortally wounded when he allows Detective Eric Finch, the head of London's police force, to shoot him numerous times. V dies in Evey's arms, leaving her to carry out the final step in his plan to blow up 10 Downing Street. Declining to learn his true identity to maintain the symbolism of his cause, she dons his Guy Fawkes mask and costume and identifies herself as V to London, which causes chaos throughout the country. Rescuing Detective Sergeant Dominic Stone from an angry mob, she brings him to the Shadow Gallery; thus, the cycle begins anew.

== In other media ==
=== Film ===
Natalie Portman as Evey Hammond

In the 2005 film adaptation, Evey is played by Natalie Portman where she is working as a runner for the British Television Network when the film begins.

=== Character differences ===
Evey is not introduced as a would-be teenage prostitute, although she is supposedly on her way to a sexual encounter with Gordon Deitrich (here, a popular talk show host at the network) when she is caught and nearly raped by Fingermen during the city curfew, and is subsequently rescued by V. Evey's trust of V develops quicker in the novel, but a more romantic angle is developed in the film. The background of her family is changed. In the film, she has an older brother who is killed by a virus that was secretly developed from the experiments on V and other inmates at Larkhill. Her parents become political activists and participate in anti-government protests. The Hammonds are arrested by the Fingermen and die in Belmarsh prison (Evey's mother starves to death during a hunger strike, while her father is shot by British soldiers during an assault on the prison). Evey's last memory of her mother is of watching her head being covered by a black bag as she is dragged away. Suddenly orphaned, Evey is sent to a child reclamation camp, "re-educated," and released back into society.

In the comic book series, V abandons Evey after he kills Lilliman; in the film, she runs away from V after attempting to betray him to Lilliman, then goes to Gordon Deitrich for protection. Evey does form a relationship with Dietrich, but the two do not become lovers, as he is homosexual. (Deitrich's arranged liaisons with female co-workers are a ruse to deflect suspicions about his sexual orientation, since homosexuality is illegal.) Soon after, however, Deitrich is arrested and mercilessly beaten by Party Leader Peter Creedy as the Fingermen raid Deitrich's home as part of official revenge for Deitrich having satirised the Chancellor on television. V gets to Evey before Creedy does and captures her himself, though she is led to believe she's in the hands of the Fingermen. The ensuing sequences involving the torture Evey undergoes, the inspiration she finds in Valerie's letters, and her character's transformation are all taken from the graphic novel.

Unlike in the graphic novel, Evey does not personally take up the mantle of V after his death, but she does grant him his final wish and give him a Viking funeral in a train car filled with explosives. Unlike the graphic novel, London's chief of police, Inspector Eric Finch, discovers her. Also, unlike the comic book series, Creedy and his men have already mortally wounded V; thus, he is dead by the time Finch finds them. Finch, who secretly sympathizes with V's cause, lets her pull the lever to release the explosive-laden Underground train. Evey and Finch then watch as Parliament is destroyed by V's funeral car, ending Norsefire's oppressive reign over England.

During the scene where Eric Finch tells his partner Dominic Stone about his visit to Larkhill — and his feelings about the chain of events of everything that had happened and everything that was going to happen — a very short shot of Evey Hammond can be seen. She wears a turquoise dress while tending to a bouquet of Scarlet Carsons and then turns away: the reflection in a mirror behind her sharpens, revealing either Eric Finch or Dominic Stone sipping a drink while in a chair. This seems to suggest the two end up in a relationship after the film concludes as, unlike the shots of other events, this does not occur in the movie itself.

=== Natalie Portman ===
Evey is portrayed in the film by Natalie Portman. Portman first met director James McTeigue while filming Star Wars: Episode II – Attack of the Clones: he was working as assistant director. She allegedly beat several other notable actresses to get the part. It was announced in early January 2005 that Portman was cast in the film. During production, she took voice coaching lessons from Barbara Berkery to perfect an English accent, working with her every day for a month before filming began. Her head was shaved in a single take.
