= Evey =

Evey may refer to:

- Evey Hammond, a character in the comic book series V for Vendetta

== People with the surname ==
- Dick Evey (1941–2013), American football player
