= Norsefire =

Fictional far-right political party

- V for Vendetta (comic); V for Vendetta (film); Pennyworth (TV series); organization
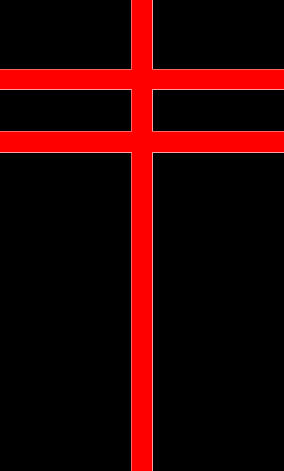
- Party logo, flag and insignia as portrayed in the film adaptation

In-universe information
- Type: Political party
- Leader: Adam Susan (Adam Sutler in the film) (formerly; deceased); Peter Creedy (formerly after the death of Adam Susan; deceased)
- Key people: List of members: Adam Susan (former leader/the Head; deceased); Peter Creedy (former leader/the Head after the death of Adam Susan; former head of the Finger after the death of Derek Almond; deceased); Derek Almond (former head of the Finger; deceased); Conrad Heyer (former head of the Eye; deceased); Brian Etheridge (former head of the Ear; deceased); Eric Finch (former head of the Nose); Roger Dascombe (former head of the Mouth; deceased); Lewis Prothero (former Commander of Larkhill Resettlement Camp; former Voice of Fate); Anthony Lilliman (former Chaplain of Larkhill Resettlement Camp; former Bishop of London; deceased); Delia Surridge (former doctor of Larkhill Resettlement Camp; former forensic pathologist of the Nose; former botanist of the Nose; deceased)
- Slogan: "Strength through Purity, Purity through Faith" (comic); "Strength through Unity, Unity through Faith" (film)
- Colours: Black and white (comic); Black and red (film)
- Political ideology: Nordicism; British neo-fascism; Clerical fascism; White supremacism
- Political position: Far-right

Norsefire is the fictional far-right white supremacist and neo-fascist political party ruling the United Kingdom in Alan Moore and David Lloyd's V for Vendetta comic book/graphic novel series, its 2005 film adaptation, and the 2019 television series Pennyworth.

The organization gained power promising stability and restoration of the United Kingdom after a worldwide nuclear war between the United States and the Soviet Union decimates Earth. Britain survives due to its geographic isolation and the decommissioning of the British nuclear arsenal, but suffer widespread damage leading to societal instability, a catalyst for the rise of Norsefire.

Due to the chaotic state of the world outside of the United Kingdom, the party gained power by promising order and security among the population. However, while the Norsefire regime did indeed bring order back to the country, this order came at a cost. Political opponents along with religious and ethnic minorities were rounded up and sent to concentration camps. With their potential enemies all removed within a short space of time, Norsefire began consolidating their power over the country.

In public, the party portrays itself as a Christian fascist party supportive of the Anglican Communion. In private, the party leaders are apathetic on the subject, and allow higher-ranking members to not follow Christian morality or Christianity in private as long as such activities do not threaten the party's power. For instance, propagandist Lewis Prothero takes illicit drugs, Bishop Lilliman sexually abuses children, and three Fingermen attempt to rape Evey Hammond when they apprehend her. The head of the party, Leader Adam Susan, actually worships Fate, the super-computer surveillance system that surveys the nation, and considers himself and his creation God. While this is not explored in the film, both the novel and film imply that Susan/Sutler is not a religious fanatic so much as a person who values security and order above all else and maintains it by eliminating political opponents and cultural minorities.

The Norsefire party is loosely based on the Nazi Party and the private religious views of Adolf Hitler.

== Overview ==
In the story, the party is presented as rising during a post-apocalyptic Britain that has narrowly avoided an international nuclear war from 1988 on. As displayed during the story of Evey Hammond, although the United Kingdom did not suffer any nuclear attacks, the effects of full-scale nuclear war on other countries had severe effects on the environment, and thus on agriculture. This in its turn severely damaged the British economy and mass riots broke out. As Evey relays to V, an anarchist determined to destroy Norsefire, the government quickly collapsed and chaos overran the country.

The situation turned after several years. From the madness of the violence came the ultra-right-wing Norsefire regime: fascists (similar to Oswald Mosley's British Union of Fascists) that united with the surviving big companies and businesses, giving them the appearance of wealth and stability. After seizing control of the country, the party gained complete control over the Church of England and other influential organizations to promote doctrines favourable to Norsefire. They began promoting and demoting members of the clergy as they saw fit. They also took over the television companies, creating NTV (Norsefire Television), and implemented the technologies that would allow for a closely monitored society, including closed-circuit television. In the novel, the British monarchy continues under Queen Zara. No direct reference is made to the monarchy in the film, though "God Save the King" is played during a television comedy sketch to greet an actor playing Chancellor Sutler.

By the time the story of the graphic novel has begun, Norsefire has shut down the concentration camps and is essentially in complete control of society. Although competition exists between the varying branches of the state, they generally have complete control over the United Kingdom. Their control over the state soon faces a threat from V, the anarchist protagonist of the story who seeks to overthrow the regime and allow the people to decide their own fate. By the end of the novel, every top government official and notable figure in Norsefire has died, except for Lewis Prothero, who is driven insane by V and incapacitated by Norsefire early on in the novel, and Eric Finch, who leaves Norsefire after he kills V and when Norsefire collapses.

=== Film ===
In the 2005 film adaptation, amidst worldwide turmoil, members of what would later become Norsefire launch a plan to seize power by releasing a virus on the British populace and blaming it on their enemies. After the virus devastates Britain, the party wins an overwhelming victory in that year's general election and subsequently markets a cure through a pharmaceutical company under the control of top-ranking party members, who become extremely wealthy as a result.

In the film, in addition to its white supremacist and Christian Nationalist views, Norsefire also expresses Anti-Americanism, shown when Prothero mocks the United States (which is said to be devastated by the virus and a second civil war), calling it the "Ulcered Sphincter of Arse-erica". He gloats at the current state of the country and suggests that cargo coming from America in a bid for aid be dumped as revenge for the Boston Tea Party. Prothero then claims that the United States has fallen as "judgement" for "godlessness". It is later shown that the United States fought a disastrous war in the Middle East, which may have contributed to Anti-American sentiment in the United Kingdom.

The party is also shown to be extremely anti-Muslim and intolerant of any criticism of its top leadership or their religion. Popular talk show host Gordon Deitrich is arrested for airing a sketch that mocks Adam Sutler, the leader of Norsefire in the film, and is subsequently executed after a copy of the Quran and several homoerotic photographs are found at his home.

In the film, after killing Prothero and several other high-ranking party officials, V persuades Creedy to betray Sutler, arguing that Sutler would turn on him eventually, in exchange for him surrendering. Finding Sutlers Bunker, Creedy kidnaps and executes him, only for V to subsequently kill him and his entire team of agents, though he is fatally wounded in the process. Evey places his body inside a train loaded with explosives, which V intended to use to bomb Parliament. Finch arrives, only to let her activate the train, having grown disillusioned and disgusted with the Norsefire regime. The bomb-filled train explodes, destroying Parliament (and presumably high ranking members of the party along with it) as hundreds of V's supporters watch.

=== Motto ===
A common recurring motto is "Strength through Purity, Purity through Faith" (or in the film, "Strength through Unity, Unity through Faith"). Another maxim often used by Norsefire as a salute is "England Prevails".

=== Symbols ===
In the book, a blue "N" on a black flag is the symbol of the party. An "N" or "NF" are the only party symbols shown.

In the film, the Norsefire symbol is the Cross of Saint George combined with a Nordic cross in red and black, with the black possibly taken from the flag of Saint David and the Nordic cross representing Scotland. The symbol is shown on flags, police badges, coat of arms, government vehicles, and army beret badges. Two versions exist, one with a red cross on a black background and another with a black cross on a red background.

== See also ==
- British Union of Fascists
- Ingsoc
- National Front
