= V (character) =

Title character of V for Vendetta

- V in V for Vendetta; Art by David Lloyd.

Publication information
- Publisher: Vertigo imprint of DC Comics (originally Quality Communications)
- First appearance: Warrior #1 (March 1982)
- Created by: Alan Moore; David Lloyd

In-story information
- Alter ego: N/A
- Notable aliases: Patient #5, The Terrorist, Codename V, Project V, The Man from Room Five
- Abilities: Enhanced strength, agility and reflexes; Genius-level intellect; Master fencer, martial artist and marksman; Master computer hacker; Master of stealth; Master in demolition

V is the titular protagonist of the comic book series V for Vendetta, created by Alan Moore and David Lloyd. He is a mysterious anarchist, vigilante, and freedom fighter who is easily recognizable by his Guy Fawkes mask, long black hair wig, and dark clothing consisting of a wide-brimmed black felt hat, a flowing black cape, black jacket, black pants, black boots, and a belt to hold his daggers. He strives to topple the totalitarian regime of a dystopian United Kingdom through acts of heroism. According to Moore, he was designed to be morally ambiguous, so that readers could decide for themselves whether he was a hero fighting for a cause or simply insane.

== Fictional character biography ==
=== Origin ===
V's background and identity are never revealed. He is at one point an inmate at "Larkhill Resettlement Camp"—one of many concentration camps where Black British people, Jews, beatniks, homosexuals, and Muslims are exterminated by Norsefire, a fascist dictatorship that rules Britain following worldwide catastrophe. While there, he is part of a group of prisoners who are subjected to horrific medical experimentation, conducted by Dr. Delia Surridge. Lewis Prothero is the camp's commandant, while Father Anthony Lilliman, a paedophile vicar, is at the camp to lend "spiritual support". All prisoners who are part of the experimentation eventually die, with the sole exception of "the man in room five" ("V" in Roman numerals). As a result of the experiments, the man develops Olympic-level physical abilities and an incredibly expanded intellect. During that time, the man had some level of communication with Valerie Page, a former actress imprisoned for being a lesbian, kept in "room four", who wrote her autobiography on toilet paper and then pushed it through a hole in the wall.

Over time, the man is allowed to grow roses (Violet Carsons) and raise crops for the camp officials. The man eventually starts taking surplus ammonia-based fertilizer back to his cell, where he arranges it in bizarre, intricate patterns on the floor. He then takes a large amount of grease solvent from the gardens. In secret, the man uses the fertilizer and solvent to make mustard gas and napalm. On a stormy night (namely, 23 December in the novel or 5 November in the film), he detonates his homemade bomb and escapes his cell. Much of the camp is set ablaze, and many of the guards are killed by the mustard gas. The camp is evacuated and closed down. He adopts the new identity "V", and dons a Guy Fawkes mask and costume. V spends the next five years planning his revenge on Norsefire and building his secret underground base, which he calls "The Shadow Gallery". He then eliminates most of the over 40 surviving personnel from Larkhill, making each killing look accidental.

=== The "Villain" ===
Four years after his escape from Larkhill, V blows up the Palace of Westminster on 5 November, Guy Fawkes Day. In the process he stumbles across Evey Hammond as she is being accosted by several members of "the Finger", Norsefire's secret police, and saves her, bringing her back to his lair. V then kidnaps Prothero, who is now the "Voice of Fate" on the government's propaganda radio, and drives him insane by destroying his prized doll collection in a satire of the exterminations that occurred at Larkhill. V kills now-Bishop Lilliman by forcing him to eat a communion wafer laced with cyanide. V then injects Surridge, the one Larkhill official who feels remorse for her actions, with a poison that kills her without pain.

V stages an attack on the government's propaganda broadcasting station, strapping himself with explosives and forcing the staff to follow his orders under threat of detonating them. V then broadcasts a message to the people, telling them to take responsibility for themselves and rise up against their government. He systematically kills the department leaders of Norsefire, except for Eric Finch, the head of Norsefire's police force, whom V senses is a decent man. V also radicalizes Evey by abducting her and making her believe she has been thrown into a government prison, where she undergoes humiliation and torture to make her confess; when she announces that she would rather die than inform on V, he reveals the ruse to her. While she initially condemns him, she eventually comes to understand what he was trying to do and becomes his accomplice. V explains to her that he is an anarchist in the strict political sense of the term, and essentially believes all governments will eventually turn into oppressive fascist states. V's goal is not simply to overthrow the Norsefire regime, but to destroy the organized state entirely. He hopes that from the rubble will emerge a utopian anarchistic society – not "the land of take what you want" but "the land of do as you please".

As the graphic novel reaches its climax, V destroys the government's CCTV surveillance buildings, eroding its control over British citizens. Moments later, however, Finch shoots and mortally wounds V at the abandoned Victoria Station. V staggers back to the Shadow Gallery, where he dies in Evey's arms. Evey then puts him in state, surrounded by Violet Carson roses, lilies, and gelignite, in an Underground train that strikes a blockage on the tracks right under 10 Downing Street, which V had previously prepared. The explosives-laden train detonates under 10 Downing Street, giving V a Viking funeral, fulfilling his final request to Evey, who takes on his mantle.

== Powers and abilities ==
V possesses enhanced strength, agility, and reflexes. He is also an expert at fencing, martial arts, marksmanship, and hacking.

V is also shown to be good at stealth and demolitions.

=== Equipment ===
V wields an assortment of daggers.

== In other media ==
=== Film ===
Hugo Weaving as V in the 2005 film V for Vendetta

- The 2005 film adaptation of the comic book starred Hugo Weaving as V. James Purefoy was originally cast as V, but was replaced by Weaving six weeks into production. Purefoy stated that he found it hard to act while wearing the mask, and that was the reason for his departure. Although some of Purefoy's performance was used in the final film, Weaving received sole credit. The film depicts him as being disfigured as a result of the fiery explosion at Larkhill, and having near-superhuman physical abilities as a result of the biological experiments he was put through. He claims to have lost all memory of his past, completing his transformation into the "everyman" he claims to be in the comic. Several events involving V differ markedly from the comics. He sets his first bomb to destroy the Old Bailey and targets the Houses of Parliament one year later, but he does not blow up the Post Office or 10 Downing Street and the bomb he leaves in Jordan Tower is safely defused (with it being unclear if he ever legitimately wanted that bomb to go off or just set it up as an excuse while he transmitted his message). Also, where the comic V was portrayed as a political anarchist who sought the destruction of all governments, the movie V focuses his anti-government philosophy exclusively on Norsefire, commenting to Evey as he prepares for his final stand that he leaves it up to her if Parliament should be destroyed, as he recognizes that he no longer has a right to shape a world he will not see. V is also shown sobbing (possibly out of grief or self-loathing for what he has put Evey through) after Evey's voluntary departure, and admits before his death that he fell in love with her. In place of Finch, Norsefire official Peter Creedy and his men confront V at the climax of the film, bringing High Chancellor Adam Sutler (Adam Susan in the graphic novel) as V has demanded. Creedy executes Sutler, but V refuses Creedy's command to take off his mask and surrender: through a hail of gunfire, V stays on his feet long enough to kill Creedy and his men. A metal breastplate under his cape stops most of the bullets, but V is still mortally wounded. He staggers down to the tunnel, where Evey is waiting, and dies in her arms. She places his body on the explosive-laden train for a Viking funeral, but Finch arrives with the intent of arresting her. However, he relents and allows Evey to start the train, having finally decided to turn his back on the tyrannical Norsefire regime. The two watch, along with thousands of spectators dressed as V, as the train explodes and destroys the Houses of Parliament.
- A parody of V appears in Epic Movie, portrayed by Anwar Burton.

== Bibliography ==
=== Warrior ===
- Warrior #1–16, 18–26, with an Alan Moore V for Vendetta feature in #17
- V for Vendetta
  - Vol. I of X V for Vendetta September 1988
  - Vol. II of X V for Vendetta October 1988
  - Vol. III of X V for Vendetta November 1988
  - Vol. IV of X V for Vendetta December 1988
  - Vol. V of X V for Vendetta December 1988
  - Vol. VI of X V for Vendetta December 1988
  - Vol. VII of X V for Vendetta January 1989
  - Vol. VIII of X V for Vendetta February 1989
  - Vol. IX of X V for Vendetta March 1989
  - Vol. X of X V for Vendetta May 1989

=== Trade paperback ===
- United States – Vertigo Comics (ISBN 0-930289-52-8)
- United Kingdom – Titan Books (ISBN 1-85286-291-2)

== See also ==
Concepts and themes

- Anarchism and the arts
- Libertarian science fiction

Character lists

- List of fictional antiheroes
- List of DC Comics characters
- List of fictional anarchists
- List of fictional hackers
