= Fury/Black Widow: Death Duty =

1995 graphic novel

- Cover to the book.
- Date: 1995
- Main characters: Nick Fury and Black Widow
- Series: Marvel Graphic Novel
- Page count: 64 pages
- Publisher: Marvel Comics

Creative team
- Writers: Cefn Ridout
- Pencillers: Charlie Adlard
- Inkers: Charlie Adlard
- Letterers: Jonathan Babcock
- Colourists: Frank Lopez; Steve Whitaker
- Editors: Richard Ashford; Mark Gruenwald; Michael Kraiger

Original publication
- Date of publication: 1995
- Language: English
- ISBN: 978-0785101567

Fury/Black Widow: Death Duty is a graphic novel published by Marvel Comics in 1995.

== Publication history ==
The book was published in 1995 in America. It was the character Night Raven's first appearance outside of Marvel UK.

== Plot ==
Black Widow returns to Russia to see if her homeland had really changed since she left. When a diplomat is found murdered on the grounds of the United States Embassy, Nick Fury and S.H.I.E.L.D. are drawn into an international crisis that pits secret agents against the Russian mafia. Into this conflict enters Black Widow, now as a full-time Avenger as well as Russia's most famous expatriate, and Night Raven. His bloody one-man war against crime is just a pastime; his real obsession is to kill one person, Yi Yang, the woman who made him immortal.

== Reception ==
Win Wiacek of Now Read This stated "Superbly illustrated by Charlie Adlard, this is nonetheless an uncomfortable blending of genres, with a strange pace to it: almost as if there's been some savage trimming and pruning with no thought to narrative cohesion." The book was ranked sixth on Diamond's highest selling paperbacks in February 1995.

== See also ==
- 1995 in comics
