= Tony Weare =

English comics artist (1912–1994)

- Born: 1 January 1912 Wincanton, Somerset, UK
- Died: 2 December 1994 (aged 82)
- Area: Artist
- Notable works: Matt Marriott

Tony Weare (1 January 1912 – 2 December 1994) was an English comics artist best known for drawing Matt Marriott, a daily Western strip written by Jim Edgar, which ran in The Evening News from 1955 to 1977.

Tony Weare was born at Wincanton, Somerset, and studied drawing at the Bournemouth School of Art but became a trooper in a cavalry regiment where he developed a love of horses. As well as Matt Marriott, he also worked at Mickey Mouse Weekly, where he worked on "Billy Brave", "Pride of the Circus", "Savage Splendour", and "Robin Alone". He illustrated "The Colditz Story" for Junior Express and was voted Serious Strip Cartoonist of the Year, 1961. In the 1980s he drew "Rookwood" for Look and Learn magazine and a few sequences in Alan Moore and David Lloyd's V for Vendetta, at the invitation of Lloyd, an admirer of his work.

David Lloyd wrote about him:

Tony was one of just a very few strip artists here and in the US whose creative identities owed nothing to the heritage of stylisation which influenced many other newspaper adventure strip creators—he was primarily an illustrator who just happened to love drawing strips. . . . He also had a superb command of light and shade, which promoted the impression that he was drawing something he could see in front of him, rather than something he'd built up from his imagination.
