= Night Raven =

- Night Raven, cover of Night Raven the Collected Stories, by David Lloyd

Publication information
- Publisher: Marvel Comics
- First appearance: Hulk Comic #1 (March 7, 1979)
- Created by: Dez Skinn (writer); Richard Burton (editor); David Lloyd (artist)

In-story information
- Abilities: Immortal vigilante

Night Raven is a fictional superhero appearing in American comic books published by Marvel Comics. The character appears primarily in Marvel UK Comics, a division of Marvel Comics.

Night Raven first appeared in Hulk Comic #1 (March 7, 1979).

== Creation ==
Creator Dez Skinn spoke on the creation of the character stating, "Chicago has gangsters of every hue and I felt wouldn't it be great to relive the pulps of the American 1930s where you had The Spider, The Shadow, characters who, in a pre-comics world, would beat the crap out of the bad guys, so at the end of the 1970s brought back the pre-comics era of the early 1930s with a character called Night Raven, he had a brand on his hand, and he would brand people on the forehead if they were bad guys...then he would leave them a little note...that would say "WHERE BROODING DARKNESS SPREADS ITS EVIL WINGS THE NIGHT RAVEN STINGS !", because I thought that sounded a bit classical, its stolen from Milton from L'Allegro, but it doesn't matter and it sounds good...but what was interesting the artist I chose to draw Night Raven, a guy called David Lloyd, came up with this really good sort of classical shaped chest emblem, because after all comics characters have to have chest emblems and it was a symbolic looking raven which was basically a V-shape in a circle"

David Lloyd publicly discussed the look of the character stating "It was not specifically meant to evoke the raven but to be generally bird-like and scary-looking to those who should be scared by it."

== Publication history ==
Created by editors Dez Skinn and Richard Burton, the early Night Raven stories were written by Steve Parkhouse, with art by David Lloyd.

Night Raven was one of the few original characters created for Marvel UK in the 1980s, and quickly became a fan favorite, with his appearance in Hulk Weekly #2 being voted "Favourite Single Story" in the British section of the 1980 Eagle Awards. The character was also nominated for British section Eagle Awards in 1980 for "Favourite Character" and "Character Most Worthy of Own Book." Night Raven was again nominated for favourite British character in the 1981 Eagle Awards.

During the decade, Night Raven appeared in various Marvel UK titles, including a run of text stories beginning in Savage Action by Alan McKenzie and continued in Marvel Super Heroes (#382-386) by Alan McKenzie and The Daredevils (#6-11) by Alan Moore and Jamie Delano, later switching to Savage Sword of Conan and finally Captain Britain volume two. The plot device of having him appear to be immortal and indestructible but in constant pain and gradually losing his sanity as a result, due to the schemes of his equally immortal arch-foe, the Oriental female crime lord Yi Yang, caused his time setting to be gradually moved from the 1930s up to contemporary times.

In the 1990s the character had only a handful of appearances, most prominent of which was a graphic novel, Night Raven: House of Cards. The character's first American appearance was in a supporting role in the graphic novel Fury/Black Widow: Death Duty. In Death Duty, it is revealed that he is unable to die. Night Raven's immortality was contradicted later in the 1995 Marvel US miniseries Nocturne, in which it was revealed that the original Night Raven had died after being poisoned in the 1950s. One of his last acts was to create a battlesuit which was later donned by Graham "Gray" Poldark to become a new hero known as Nocturne. It has since been confirmed that the Nocturne story did not take place in the main Marvel comics reality.

Night Raven is glimpsed in the first issue of The Twelve, where he is one of many costumed heroes pictured in Berlin in a scene dated April 25, 1945.

== Powers and abilities ==
Upon first appearance, Night Raven had no powers, but was a highly trained fighter and marksman who wielded two guns. He was exposed to a chemical toxin by Yi Yang, which made him nearly indestructible, but deformed him and left him with chronic pain. He has a reputation for immortality, but the accuracy of this belief is unclear.

== Bibliography ==
- Night Raven (by David Lloyd):
  - "Night Raven" (with Steve Parkhouse, in Hulk Comic #1-20, Marvel UK, 1979, collected in Night Raven: The Collected Stories, 64 pages, October 1990, ISBN 1-85400-227-9)
  - "House Of Cards" (with Jamie Delano, one shot, Marvel UK, 1991, ISBN 1-85400-288-0)
- Nocturne (by Dan Abnett, with pencils by Joe Fonteriz and inks by John Stokes (1-2 and 4), 4-issue mini-series, Marvel Comics, 1994)
