= David Lloyd (comics) =

English illustrator (born 1950)

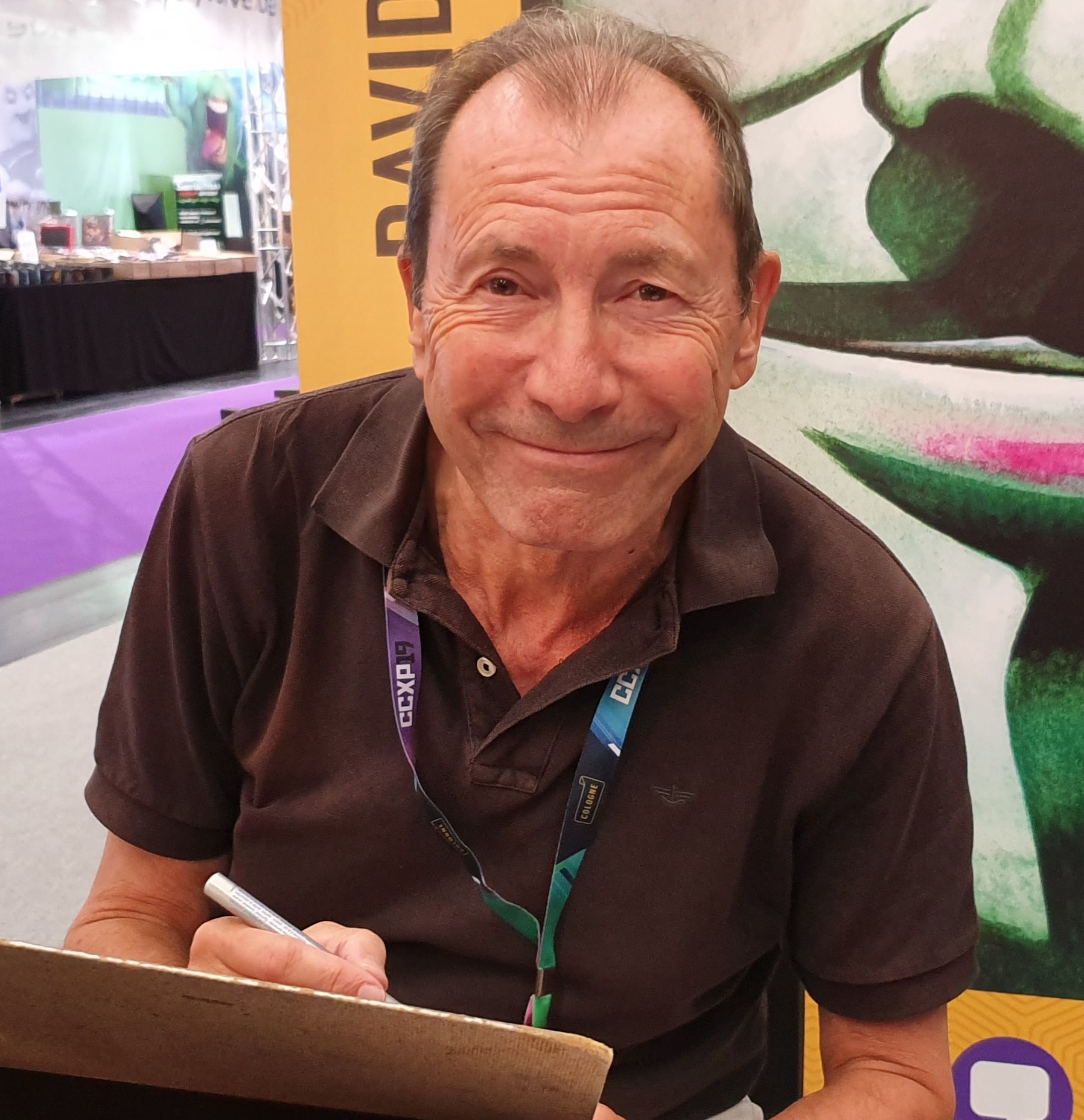
- Lloyd at CCXP Cologne 2019
- Born: 1950 (age 75–76) London, England
- Areas: Writer, Penciller, Inker, Colourist
- Notable works: Night Raven; V for Vendetta (mask)

David Lloyd (born 1950) is an English comics artist best known as the illustrator of the story V for Vendetta, written by Alan Moore, and the designer of its anarchist protagonist V and the modern Guy Fawkes/V mask, the latter going on to become a symbol of protest.

Other series he has illustrated include Wasteland, Espers, Hellblazer, Global Frequency, The Territory, and licensed properties such as Aliens and James Bond. In 2012 Lloyd established Aces Weekly, an online comics anthology.

== Early life ==
David Lloyd was born in Enfield, London, in 1950.

== Career ==
Lloyd started working in comics in the late 1970s, drawing for Halls of Horror, TV Comic and a number of Marvel UK titles. With writer Steve Parkhouse, he created the pulp adventure character Night Raven. Lloyd names John Burns, Steve Ditko, Ronald Embleton, Jack Kirby, and Tony Weare as artistic influences. Lloyd drew a comics adaptation of the Time Bandits film in 1982.

=== Warrior and V for Vendetta ===
Lloyd briefly discussing V for Vendetta in 2011

Dez Skinn set up Warrior magazine in 1982 and asked Lloyd to create a new pulp character. Lloyd and writer Alan Moore, who had previously collaborated on several Doctor Who stories at Marvel UK, created V for Vendetta, a dystopian adventure featuring a flamboyant anarchist terrorist—V—fighting against a future fascist government. Lloyd, who illustrated in cinematic chiaroscuro, devised V's Guy Fawkes-inspired appearance and suggested that Moore avoid captions, sound effects and thought balloons. Lloyd stated in a 2005 interview that "I don't know why I thought of Guy Fawkes, because it was during the summer. I thought that would be great if he looked like Guy Fawkes, kind of theatrical. I just suggested it to Alan, and he said, 'that sounds like a good idea.' It gave us everything, the costume and everything. During the summer, I couldn't get any of these masks. These masks that you could get in every shop had a smile built into them. So I created this Guy Fawkes mask with a kind of smile. It was an ideal costume for this future anarchist persona." After Warrior folded in 1984, the series was reprinted and continued in colour by DC Comics in 10 issues published during 1988-89 and collected as a graphic novel in 1990.

It was adapted into a film released in 2005. The stylized Guy Fawkes/V mask Lloyd created for the character became a symbol of protest. It was adopted as the symbol for the online hacktivist group Anonymous after appearing in web forums. It has also been used in Project Chanology, the Occupy movement, Anonymous for the Voiceless, the fictional F-Society in Mr. Robot, and other anti-establishment protests around the world.

=== Later career ===
Lloyd was one of the artists on the graphic horror anthology Wasteland for DC Comics with writers John Ostrander and Del Close. Lloyd has also worked on Espers, with writer James D. Hudnall, for Eclipse Comics; Hellblazer, with writers Grant Morrison and Jamie Delano, and War Story, with Garth Ennis, for DC; and Global Frequency, with Warren Ellis, for WildStorm. With Delano he drew The Territory for Dark Horse Comics, where he also worked on some of their licensed properties such as Aliens and James Bond. In 2006 Lloyd created a graphic novel, Kickback, for the French publisher Editions Carabas.

In 2012 Lloyd established Aces Weekly, an online comics anthology featuring creators such as Mark Wheatley, Val Mayerik, John McCrea, Phil Hester, Lew Stringer and David Leach.

== Bibliography ==
- Night Raven:
  - "Night Raven" (with Steve Parkhouse, Marvel UK, 1979)
  - "House Of Cards" (with Jamie Delano, Marvel UK, one shot, 1993)
- Hulk: "Dr Scarabeus" (inks, with Steve Moore and pencils by Paul Neary, in Hulk Comic #15–20, Marvel UK, 1979)
- Doctor Who (with Alan Moore, Marvel UK):
  - "Black Legacy" (in Doctor Who Magazine #35–38, 1980, reprinted in Doctor Who #14, Marvel Comics)
  - "Business as Usual" (in Doctor Who Magazine #40–43, 1980 reprinted in Doctor Who #15, Marvel Comics)
  - "The 4-D War" (in Doctor Who Magazine #51, reprinted in The Daredevils #6, 1980)
  - "Black Sun Rising" (in Doctor Who Magazine #57, also The Daredevils #7, 1980)
- Time Bandits (pencils, with Steve Parkhouse and inks by John Stokes, film adaptation, Marvel, 1982)
- V for Vendetta (with Alan Moore, first two books serialised in Warrior #1–26, 1982–1985, DC Comics, 10 issues, 1988–1989, tpb, DC, 1995)
- Sláine: "Cauldron of Blood" (with Pat Mills, in Dice Man #1, 1986)
- Wasteland (with John Ostrander and Del Close, DC, 1987–1988)
  - "Foo Goo" (artist, in #1, December 1987)
  - "Warning Signals" (artist, in #2, January 1988)
  - "Dies Illa" (artist, in #3, February 1988)
  - "Big Crossover Issue" (artist, in #5, April 1988)
  - "Method Actor" (artist/colourist, in #6, May 1988)
  - "Secret Lords of the DNA" (artist/colourist, in #7, June 1988)
  - "Del & Elron" (artist/colourist, in #9, August 1988)
  - "Life's Illusion" (artist/colourist, in #10, September 1988)
  - "Embryo" (artist/colourist, in #11, October 1988)
- Hellblazer:
  - Rare Cuts (trade paperback, 2005, Titan, ISBN 1-84023-974-3, DC/Vertigo, ISBN 1-4012-0240-3) collects:
    - "Early Warning" (with Grant Morrison, Hellblazer #25–26, 1990)
    - "This is the Diary of Danny Drake" (with Garth Ennis, Hellblazer #56, 1993)
  - Shoot (trade paperback, 2014, DC/Vertigo, ISBN 978-1401247485) collects:
    - "Christmas Cards" (with Jamie Delano, Hellblazer #250, 2008)
  - The Horrorist (with Jamie Delano, Vertigo, two–issue mini–series, 1995, collected in The Devil You Know, 2007, ISBN 1-4012-1269-7)
- Sandman Mystery Theatre Annual #1 (with Matt Wagner and Steven T. Seagle, Vertigo, 1994)
- The Territory (with Jamie Delano, Dark Horse Comics, four–issue mini–series, 1999, tpb, 96 pages, 2006, ISBN 1-59307-010-1)
- War Story (with Garth Ennis, Vertigo, standalone one shots):
  - "Nightingale" (2001, collected in War Stories: Volume 1, 2004 ISBN 1-84023-912-3)
  - "J for Jenny" (2003, collected in War Stories: Volume 2, 2006 ISBN 1-4012-1039-2)
- "Have You Seen...?" (with Dan Abnett and Andy Lanning, 9-11: The World's Finest Comic Book Writers & Artists Tell Stories to Remember, Volume Two, 2002, DC, tpb)
- Kickback (original French edition, Editions Carabas, 2005, English edition, 2006, Dark Horse Comics, ISBN 1-59307-659-2)
- Kickback: The iPad Graphic Novel (published by Panel Nine Publishing, 2012)
- São Paulo (original Brazilian edition, editora Casa 21, 2007, ISBN 978-8588627116)

Preceded by Ron Tiner	Hellblazer artist 1990	Succeeded by Dave McKean
