= Guy Fawkes mask =

Stylized mask portaying Guy Fawkes

A Guy Fawkes mask, designed by David Lloyd for V for Vendetta (1982–1989)

The Guy Fawkes mask (also known as the V for Vendetta mask) is a stylised depiction of Guy Fawkes (the best-known member of the Gunpowder Plot, an attempt to blow up the House of Lords in London on 5 November 1605) created by illustrator David Lloyd for the 1982–1989 graphic novel V for Vendetta written by Alan Moore with art by Lloyd. Derived from the masks used to represent Fawkes being burned on an effigy having long previously had roots as part of Guy Fawkes Night celebrations, Lloyd designed the mask as a smiling face with red cheeks, a wide moustache upturned at both ends, and a thin vertical pointed beard, worn in the graphic novel's narrative by the protagonist V, a fictional anarchist vigilante.

Following the release of the graphic novel and its 2005 film adaptation, this design came to represent broad protest, later also becoming a symbol for the online hacktivist group "Anonymous" after appearing in web forums, used in Project Chanology, the Occupy movement, Anonymous for the Voiceless, and other anti-establishment protests around the world. This has led to the mask also being known by the alternate name of the Anonymous mask.

The mask used in the 2005 film V for Vendetta was based on a plaster cast of the face of Stephan Gessler, an art director involved in the film's production. The cast was then artistically adapted by sculptor Bernd Wentzel to create the final mask design.

== Origins ==
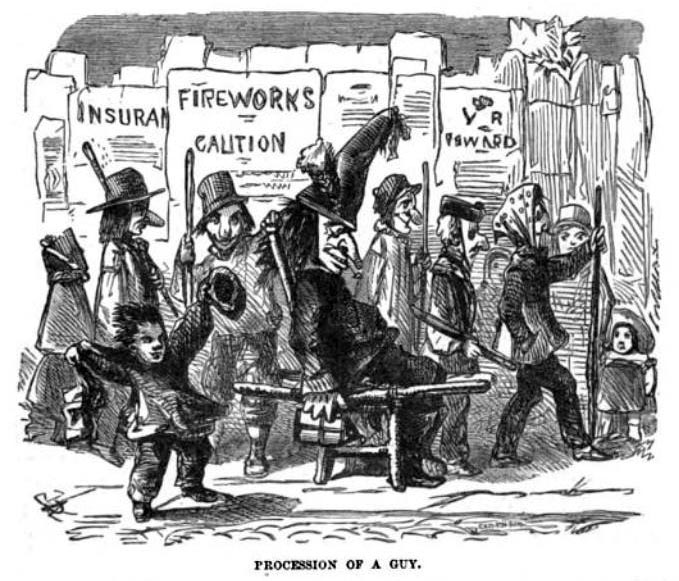
A masked Guy being paraded on Guy Fawkes Night, 1868

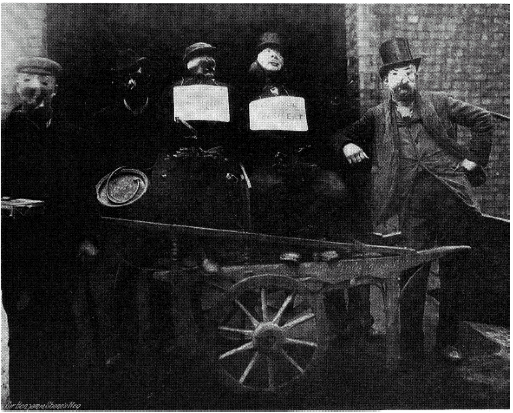
Guy Fawkes effigies and collectors, all masked, 1903, by John Benjamin Stone

The Gunpowder Plot of 1605 was commemorated from early on by burning effigies of unpopular figures. Towards the end of the 18th century, reports appeared of children begging for money with grotesquely masked effigies of Guy Fawkes, and 5 November gradually became known as Guy Fawkes Night, although many now prefer the term "Bonfire Night". From the 1864 Chambers Book of Days:

The universal mode of observance through all part of England is the dressing up of a scarecrow figure in such cast-habiliments as can be procured (the head-piece, generally a paper-cap, painted and knotted with paper strips in imitation of ribbons), parading it in a chair through the streets, and at nightfall burning it with great solemnity in a huge bonfire ...

In 1847, The Lancet published "Notes of a case of death from fright", in which the death of a two-year-old was attributed to the fright caused by seeing a boy wearing a red Guy Fawkes mask.

In the 20th century, in the UK, large numbers of cheap cardboard or paper Guy Fawkes masks were sold to children each autumn or given out free with comics; by the 1980s their popularity became increasingly supplanted by Halloween. In 1958, wearing Guy Fawkes masks was mentioned during a debate in the Parliament of Western Australia as an example of harmless and excusable (though technically unlawful) possession of a face mask at night. J.J. Brady said:

at one time it was traditional to wear masks on Guy Fawkes night. So, if tonight anyone is found wearing a Guy Fawkes mask I, as Minister for Police, will see that he is duly excused.

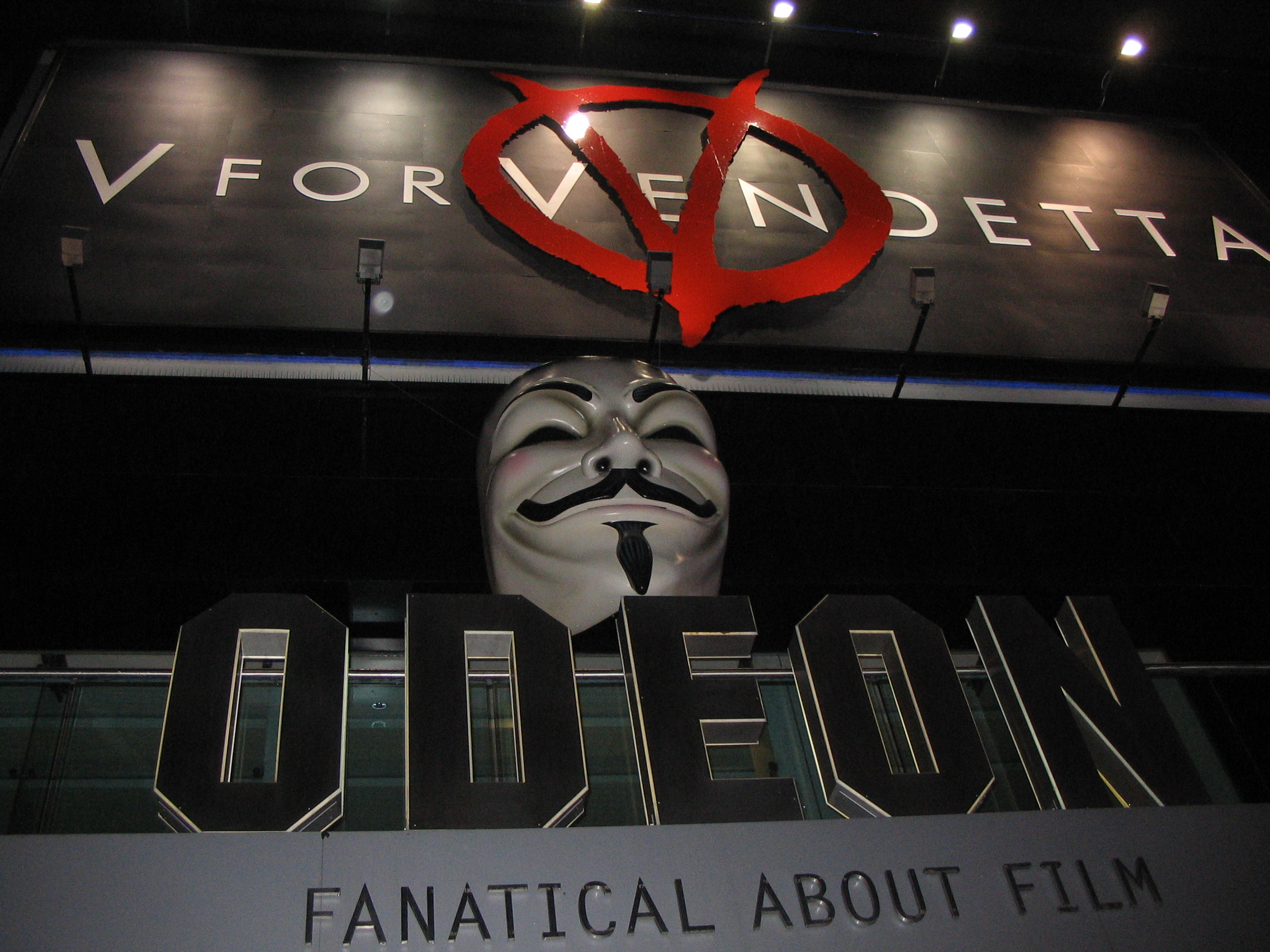
David Lloyd's Guy Fawkes mask at the Odeon Leicester Square in London during the 2006 screening of V for Vendetta

The British comic book series V for Vendetta, which started in 1982, centers on a vigilante's efforts to destroy an authoritarian government in a dystopian future United Kingdom. When developing the story, illustrator David Lloyd made a handwritten note on the intended anarchist protagonist, V: "Why don't we portray him as a resurrected Guy Fawkes, complete with one of those papier-mâché masks, in a cape and a conical hat? He'd look really bizarre and it would give Guy Fawkes the image he's deserved all these years. We shouldn't burn the chap every Nov. 5th but celebrate his attempt to blow up Parliament!" Writer Alan Moore commented that, due to Lloyd's idea,

All of the various fragments in my head suddenly fell into place, united behind the single image of a Guy Fawkes mask.

He also noted

how interesting it was that we should have taken up the image right at the point where it was apparently being purged from the annals of English iconography.

As such, 'V' wears a Guy Fawkes mask (as designed by Lloyd) throughout the story, and in the climax of its 2006 film adaptation and 2022 third season of its prequel television series, thousands of protesters adopt the same costume as they march on Parliament.

== Adoption by 21st century protesters ==
=== Background ===
Since the 2006 release of the film V for Vendetta and the mass production of David Lloyd's mask design by Warner Bros., the use of Guy Fawkes masks has become widespread internationally among groups protesting against politicians, banks, and financial institutions. The masks both conceal the identity and protect the face of individuals and demonstrate their commitment to a shared cause.

On 17 April 2006, a pair of rival groups wearing Fawkes masks confronted each other outside the New York City offices of Warner Brothers and DC Comics. One group, led by freegan Adam Weismann, protested against a perceived misrepresentation of the Anarchist movement in the film V for Vendetta. The other group, led by libertarian Todd Seavey, counter-protested against the anarchists, wearing masks purportedly supplied by a Time Warner employee.

=== Anonymous ===
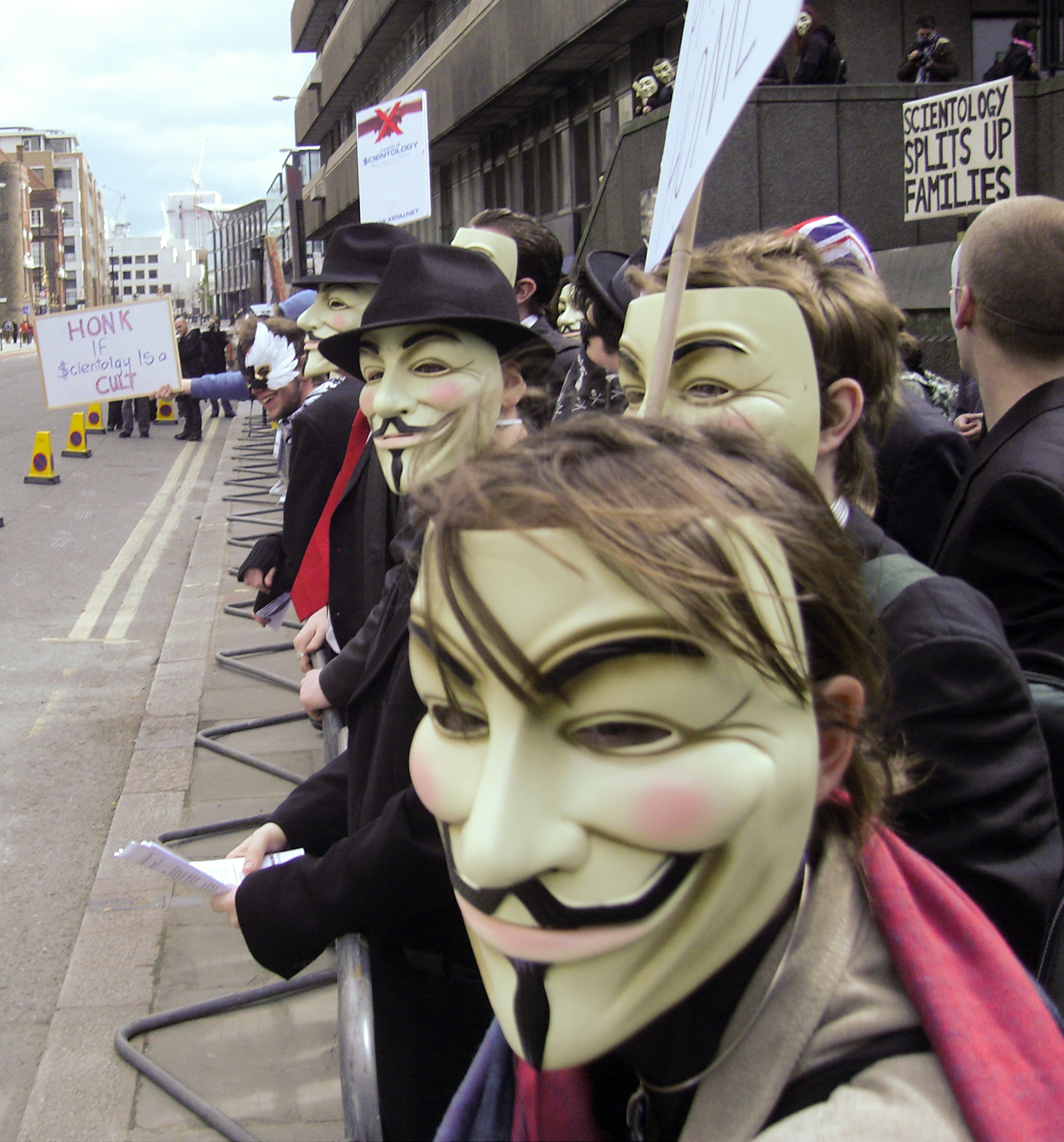
Members of the group Anonymous wear Guy Fawkes masks at a protest against the Church of Scientology (London, 2008).

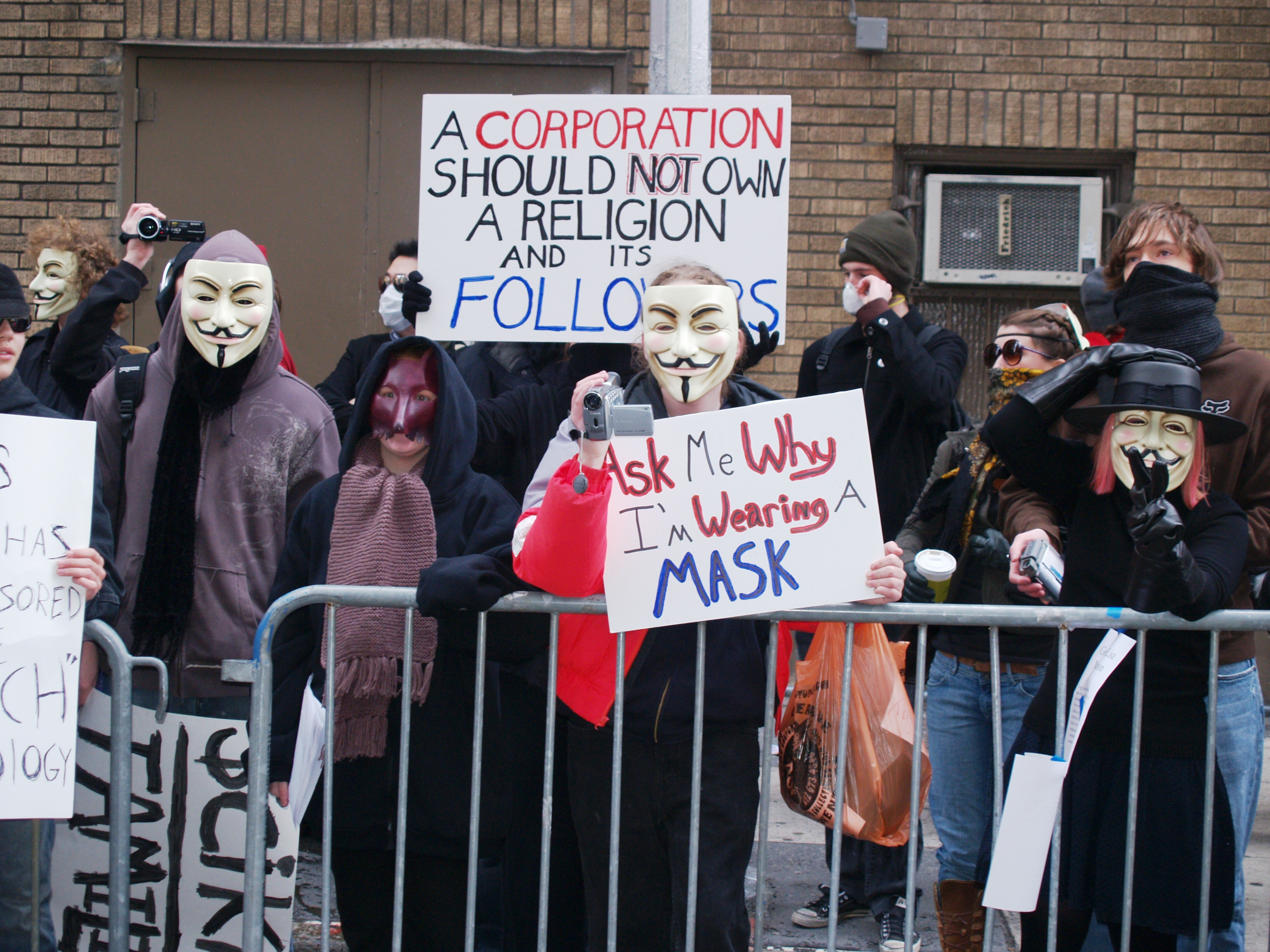
Protesters of the group Anonymous outside a Scientology center on February 10, 2008. Four of the protesters can be seen wearing Guy Fawkes masks.

The mask became associated with the hacktivism group Anonymous's Project Chanology protests against the Church of Scientology in 2008. The group protested the Church of Scientology in response to the Church forcing YouTube to pull a video of Tom Cruise discussing Scientology that was meant for internal use within the Church. In response, Anonymous protested the litigious methods of the Church of Scientology over a period of several months. Protesters were encouraged to hide their faces, since it was common practice for Church members to photograph anti-Scientology protesters. The Guy Fawkes mask was a widely used method of hiding faces.

As the protests continued, more protesters began opting to use the Guy Fawkes mask, which eventually took on symbolic status within the group. Scott Stewart of University of Nebraska at Omaha's The Gateway wrote:

Many participants sported Guy Fawkes masks to draw attention both to their identity as Anonymous and the Church of Scientology's abuse of litigation and coercion to suppress anti-Scientology viewpoints.

The Internet-based group then adopted the character for its wider protests against authority. A version of the mask was later used in the 2015 television series Mr. Robot to represent the hacktivist group F-Society, in reference to Anonymous.

=== Wider use in popular protest ===
On 23 May 2009, protesters wearing the mask detonated a fake barrel of gunpowder outside Parliament while protesting over the issue of British MPs' expenses.

During the 2011 Wisconsin protests, and then during the subsequent Occupy Wall Street and the Occupy movement, the mask appeared internationally as a symbol of popular rebellion. In October 2011, campaigner Julian Assange attended the Occupy London Stock Exchange protest wearing such a mask, which he removed after a request by the police.

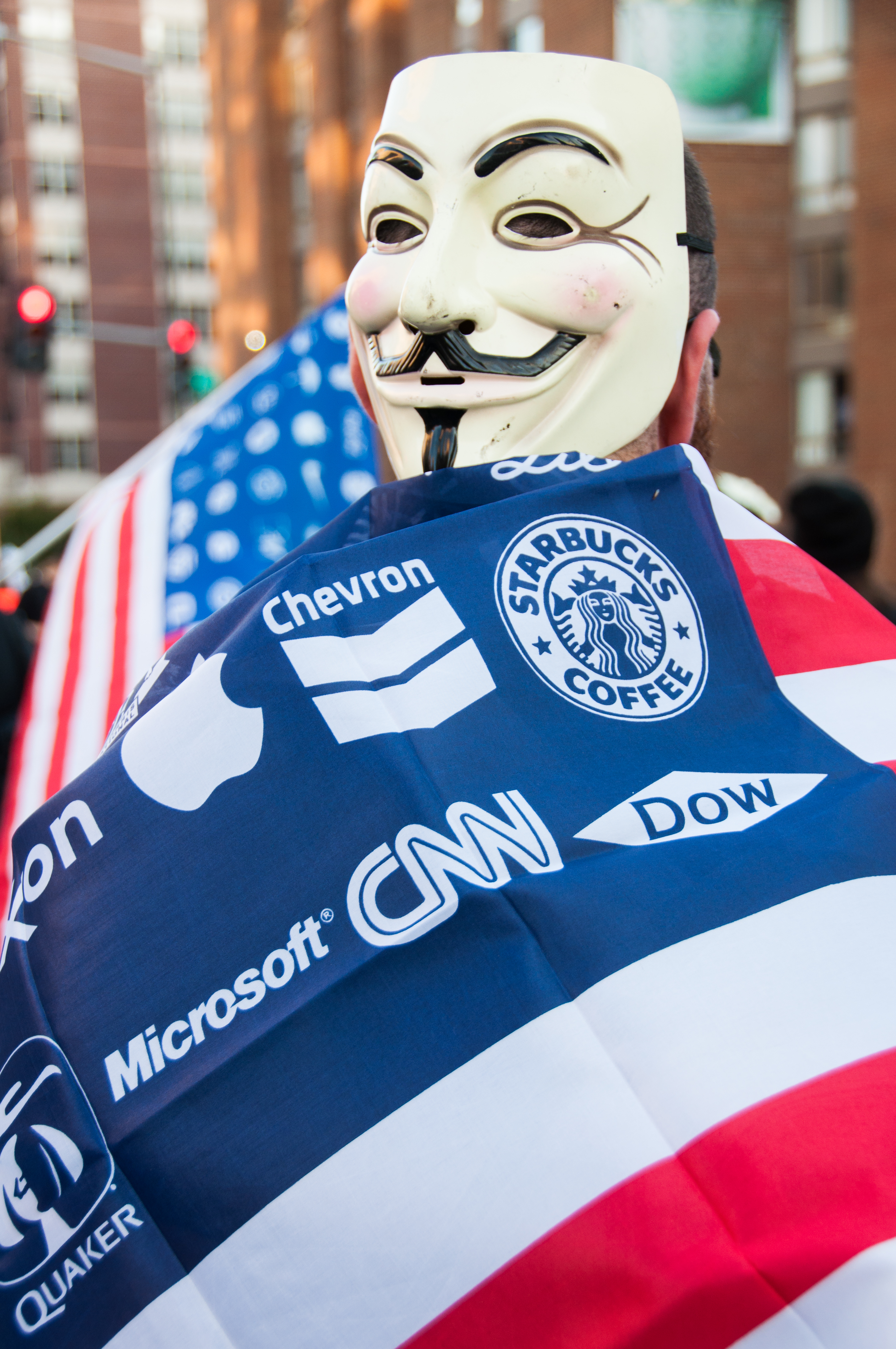
A protester in a Guy Fawkes mask during the Million Mask March. Washington, D.C., 2015.

In January 2012, Guy Fawkes masks were used by protesters against Poland's signing of ACTA.

On 10 June 2012, in Mumbai, India, a group of 100 Anonymous members and college students gathered at Azad Maidan, dressed all in black and wearing Guy Fawkes masks, to protest against the Indian Government's censorship of the Internet.

The mask, used by Bahraini protesters during the Arab Spring-inspired Bahraini uprising, was banned in the country in February 2013, a few months after a similar decision by United Arab Emirates, another Persian Gulf country. The Industry and Commerce Ministry of Bahrain said the ban on importing the mask, which it referred to as "revolution mask", was due to concerns over "public safety". The decision, described by Voice of America as "unusual", marked one of the latest in government efforts to suppress the two-year-old uprising. However, a British-based rights activist and Samuel Muston of The Independent downplayed the effect of the ban. The Manama Voice reported that use of mask in protests increased following the ban.

The masks were used by anti-government protesters in Thailand in 2012, and by protesters in Turkey in 2013. They were also used in protests in Brazil and Egypt in 2013.

In May 2013, the government of Saudi Arabia banned the importation of the masks, and said it would confiscate any found to be for sale. The Ministry of Islamic Affairs stated that the mask is "a symbol of rebels and revenge", and warned imams and parents that "they could be used to incite the youth to destabilize security and spread chaos ..." On 22 September 2013, Saudi religious police prohibited the wearing of the Guy Fawkes mask, the day before Saudi Arabia's 83rd National Day.

The wearing of masks during a riot or unlawful assembly has been banned in Canada, following the enactment of Bill C-309, and now carries a maximum ten-year prison sentence.

Participants in the 2014 Venezuelan protests carried a wide variety of masks; one of them was the Guy Fawkes mask, sometimes painted with the colours of the Venezuelan flag.

In October 2019 protesters in Hong Kong started using the mask in opposition to the government's banning the use of masks during protests.

Guy Fawkes masks were also among the symbols displayed during the January 6 United States Capitol attack in 2021.

=== Views of Moore and Lloyd ===
Alan Moore, anarchist and author of V for Vendetta, described being pleased by the Fawkes mask's appearance at the protests. Whilst Moore did not create such a character for the purposes it has served, he explains to The Guardian:

suppose when I was writing V for Vendetta I would in my secret heart of hearts have thought: wouldn't it be great if these ideas actually made an impact? So when you start to see that idle fantasy intrude on the regular world ... It's peculiar. It feels like a character I created 30 years ago has somehow escaped the realm of fiction.

V for Vendetta illustrator and co-creator David Lloyd:

The Guy Fawkes mask has now become a common brand and a convenient placard to use in protest against tyranny, and I'm happy with people using it: It seems quite unique, an icon of popular culture being used this way. My feeling is the Anonymous group needed an all-purpose image to hide their identity and also symbolise that they stand for individualism. V for Vendetta is a story about one person against the system. We knew that V was going to be an escapee from a concentration camp, where he had been subjected to medical experiments, but then I had the idea that in his craziness he would decide to adopt the persona and mission of Guy Fawkes – our great historical revolutionary.

=== Sales and corporate ownership of rights ===
According to Time in 2011, the protesters' adoption of the mask had led to it becoming the top-selling mask on Amazon.com, selling hundreds of thousands a year. Skydance, which owns Warner Bros. and DC Comics, owns the rights to the image and is paid a fee with the sale of each copyrighted mask.

== See also ==
- Anti-mask law
- Richard Nixon mask

== Bibliography ==
- Geraghty, Liam (11 October 2021). "David Lloyd's unseen drafts of iconic V for Vendetta mask". Culture. The Big Issue (exclusive).
