= Cycle of the Werewolf =

1983 novella by Stephen King

- First edition cover
- Author: Stephen King
- Illustrator: Bernie Wrightson
- Language: English
- Genre: Gothic, horror
- Publisher: Land of Enchantment
- Publication date: November 1983
- Publication place: United States
- Media type: Print (Hardcover)
- Pages: 127
- ISBN: 978-0-9603828-2-8

Cycle of the Werewolf is a horror novella by American writer Stephen King, featuring illustrations by comic-book artist Bernie Wrightson. Each chapter is a short story unto itself. It tells the story of a werewolf haunting a small town as the moon turns full once every month. It was published as a limited-edition hardcover in 1983 by Land of Enchantment, and in 1985 as a mass-market trade paperback by Signet. King also wrote the screenplay for its film adaptation, Silver Bullet (1985). It is King's shortest novel to date at 127 pages, which makes it technically a novella.

== Plot ==
In the small Maine town of Tarker's Mills, a werewolf kills during each full moon over the course of a year; each chapter covers a month in the year, beginning in January and ending in December.

In January, during a severe blizzard, railroad flagman Arnie Westrum is trapped in a remote signal shack. A massive wolf-like creature forces its way inside, its snarls eerily resembling human speech. Westrum attempts to defend himself with a pickaxe, but the beast overpowers him, marking the first killing and initiating the werewolf's cycle in the otherwise quiet, traditional community. February's full moon falls on Valentine's Day, during which Stella Randolph, a lonely, overweight woman who runs a failing sewing shop, fantasizes about romantic love while surrounded by self-sent Valentine cards. A shadowy masculine figure appears at her window, but it transforms into the werewolf, which enters her room and kills her in a scene blending her illusions of passion with brutal violence. March sees the last major blizzard of the season, causing power outages across town. Amid the darkness and sleet, the werewolf claims a drifter found frozen near downed power lines, his body torn open with large paw prints surrounding him. The town, already uneasy from the prior deaths, hears distant howls but remains unable to identify the source. In April, as spring arrives, young Brady Kincaid lingers too long on the town common flying a kite under a rising full moon. The werewolf attacks and kills him, leaving his body mutilated beside the fallen kite.

May's full moon coincides with Homecoming Sunday at Grace Baptist Church. The Reverend Lester Lowe experiences a vivid nightmare in which his congregation transforms into werewolves during his sermon about the beast among them. Awakening, he discovers the janitor Clyde Corliss brutally slain and displayed in the church. June features a quiet summer night at the Chat'n Chew café. Proprietor Alfie Knopfler, alone after closing, serves a familiar regular customer who suddenly begins to change into the werewolf before his eyes. The transformation is grotesque and rapid; the creature attacks and kills Knopfler in a savage assault. July brings the cancellation of the town's Fourth of July fireworks due to the ongoing threat. Ten-year-old Marty Coslaw receives illegal fireworks from his sympathetic Uncle Al. Alone on the veranda after his family retires, Marty sets off silent fireworks. The werewolf approaches, but Marty throws exploding firecrackers into its face, blinding it in one eye and driving it away. August finds Constable Neary publicly dismissing werewolf theories in favor of a psychological explanation involving a split personality. He vows to solve the case through police work but is ambushed and killed by the creature while on stakeout, his skepticism shattered in the final moments.

In September, the werewolf slaughters Elmer Zinneman's pigs rather than a human, but the attack, marked by large, semi-human tracks, convinces some residents that organized action is necessary. Discussions turn toward a large hunt in the coming months. In October, during Halloween, Marty, trick-or-treating in a Yoda costume, encounters Lowe, who now wears an eyepatch over his left eye. Marty recognizes the resemblance to the creature he faced in July and realizes Lowe is the werewolf. He begins sending anonymous notes urging Lowe to end his life or leave town. November brings the first snow and a wave of armed men hunting the creature in the woods. Lowe, increasingly aware of his dual nature and tormented by the notes, flees to a Portland motel to avoid harming locals. There, he transforms and kills Milt Sturmfuller, an abusive local resident visiting the same motel. December culminates on New Year's Eve during a blizzard. Marty, convinced of Lowe's identity, obtains a pistol loaded with two silver bullets crafted by Uncle Al's acquaintance. As midnight approaches, the werewolf breaks into the Coslaw home through a window. Marty calmly confronts the beast, shooting it twice in the head with the silver bullets. The creature dies and reverts to the form of Lowe. Marty, exhausted but at peace, weeps as the year and the cycle of terror ends.

== Characters ==
=== The Coslaw family ===
Marty Coslaw
Marty Coslaw, a 10-year-old paraplegic, serves as the novella's protagonist. He hears the werewolf howling in March and is attacked by the beast in July, where he blinds it in one eye with a package of Black Cat firecrackers. He discovers the identity of the creature to be Reverend Lester Lowe in October and kills him with a silver bullet in December.
Nan Coslaw
Marty's mother; she tries to treat him as if he were no different from any other 10-year-old boy.
Herman Coslaw
Marty's father; he is uncomfortable interacting with his disabled son, speaking to him in a patronizing voice (called the 'Big Pal' voice by Marty). He is the coach at Tarker's Mills High School.
Kate Coslaw
Marty's 14-year-old sister; she seems jealous of all the attention Marty gets throughout much of the novella.
Grandpa Coslaw
Marty's paternal grandfather; he lives with the family. Marty has a good relationship with his grandfather, who is described as being the typical grandfather. He is noted for being a heavy sleeper.
Uncle Al
Marty's wild-living maternal uncle; he always seems to be in the doghouse with his sister. Al treats Marty better than anyone else in the story, and buys him the fireworks Marty uses to blind the werewolf in one eye after the Fourth of July fireworks are cancelled. He also supplies Marty with the silver bullets and the gun he uses to kill the beast in December.

=== The Werewolf ===
Reverend Lester Lowe, the werewolf, is first mentioned in the story in April, preaching a sermon about the coming of spring. Around May, he has a nightmare in which his entire congregation—and then he himself—transform into werewolves before he awakens. The next morning, he finds Clyde Corliss, a custodian, dead on the pulpit at his church. He is seen as a pillar of the community and has been viewed that way for years, coming to call Tarker's Mills home.

Lowe has not been a werewolf his entire life, nor has he been a werewolf since he first arrived in Tarker's Mills. In fact, it is never explained (nor that he has any idea) about how he became a werewolf, but he suspects that it has something to do with some flowers he picked at a cemetery on Sunshine Hill months prior to his first transformation. He went to put them in vases at the church vestry, but they turned black and died before he could finish the relatively quick job. He has no reason to pinpoint this event as the beginning of his curse, but he believes that this was the beginning of the events.

Lowe comes to realize that he is the werewolf after having awakened with fresh blood on his fingernails and (to his horror) mouth. He also discovers his clothes are missing or sometimes finds scratches and bruises, which appear to have come from running through the woods. The nightmare in May serves as a further omen to his curse, but he does not fully realize his curse until July 5, when he awakens with his left eye blasted out. After Halloween, he began getting anonymous letters from someone who knows his secret, suspecting that it is the person whom he attacked in July and failed to kill, the person who blasted his left eye out. In November, he acknowledges that he is the werewolf and decides that he cannot risk going out in the woods, as he could be killed by the group of vigilantes who had taken to the woods that month.

To avoid the vigilantes, he travels to Portland, where he coincidentally kills Tarker's Mills resident Milt Sturmfuller outside a cheap motel. After returning home, he decides to find out whom he attacked in July, and confront that person. Marty eventually signs his name to the last letter he sends in December, shortly before the next full moon. Lowe is killed by Marty on New Year's Eve.

=== The victims ===
Arnie Westrum
Arnie is a railroad employee killed sometime in the wee hours of the morning on New Year's Day in January. He was snowbound in a blizzard after trying to clear snowdrifts off the tracks which had blocked the trains. Westrum manages to hit the werewolf with a pick axe once before it killed him.
Stella Randolph
Stella is a plus-sized, unpartnered twenty-two-year-old seamstress whose business is beginning to fail. On Valentine's Day, she sends herself cards from 1980s heartthrobs and longs for a sweetheart. She sees the werewolf watching her from outside her window and lets it in, believing she is dreaming and he is her fantasy sweetheart come to life. The werewolf pounces on her and kills Stella in her bed.
The drifter
A drifter killed on St. Patrick's Day in March, he is found by an employee of the Electric and Gas Company while searching for downed lines. His body is surrounded by wolf prints.
Brady Kincaid
Brady Kincaid is an 11-year-old boy killed while flying his kite on April Fool’s Day. He had an expensive kite and stayed out too late as he became fascinated by it. He is found the next day, decapitated and disemboweled in the town park.
Clyde Corliss
Corliss is found dead in the Grace Baptist Church by Reverend Lowe on Homecoming Sunday in May. He had done janitorial work at the church since the late 1970s.
Alfie Knopfler
Knopfler is the owner of the Chat 'n' Chew, the town's only diner. He is killed after high-school graduation in June in his diner. He sees the werewolf transform in front of him before he is killed.
Constable Lander Neary
Neary is the town constable and is frustrated by his inability to solve the case and by his patronizing treatment by the Maine State Police. Neary reveals that Marty was sent to stay with some relatives in Stowe, Vermont, for the rest of the summer after his attack in July. His fellow troopers do not let Neary interview the boy, but allow him to have a copy of the deposition Marty gave to them. In it, Marty describes the werewolf in vivid detail, which both the troopers and Neary ignore, including the fact that the werewolf is now missing his or her left eye in human form. Had they not ignored this fact, they could have apprehended Lowe immediately. Both Neary and the troopers believe Marty is suffering from extreme post-traumatic stress syndrome and that the werewolf is a manifestation by Marty's psyche as a mental block to the trauma. Neary is killed in August while drinking in his parked truck.
Elmer Zinneman's pigs
Zinneman is a pig farmer who has his entire pen of pigs killed by the werewolf, but manages to avoid being killed himself on Labor Day in September. He sees something indeterminate running into the woods after his last pig dies, but he cannot say who or what it is that he saw. The next day, he discusses the carnage with his brother Pete from two counties away. Pete tells Elmer that he knows that a werewolf is on the loose in Tarker's Mills, citing the unusual tracks in the mud as evidence. The two decide to begin hunting for the beast in November.
Milt Sturmfuller
Sturmfuller is the town librarian who is shown to physically abuse his wife in March and again in October. He begins an affair in November and starts staying at a hotel in Portland. He's ironically killed by the werewolf while at the hotel in Portland, Lowe having gone there to avoid the vigilante group set up by Zinneman.

== Background and reception ==
The story started out as a calendar to be published by Christopher Zavisa of Land of Enchantment Press, with illustrations by renowned comic-book artist Bernie Wrightson. Each month featured a drawing by Wrightson complete with a short vignette by King. King found the size of the vignettes, which were both small and extremely limited, to be a problem. King proceeded with a short novel and had it published by Land of Enchantment in 1983, complete with Wrightson's illustrations.

In the author's notes at the end of the book, King admits to taking liberties with the lunar cycle. For example, if a full moon was on New Year's Day, another one would not occur on Valentine's Day, but these dates are widely recognized in January and February. He explains that this was done to focus the relevant months more clearly in the readers' minds. Dave Langford reviewed Cycle of the Werewolf for White Dwarf #72, writing, "This is of course a werewolf yarn, competently told despite wearying heaps of bodies before we get any actual plot; the triumph of the cute, crippled kid detective over Incarnate Evil comes as no surprise. OK, but expensive for a short story."

== Reviews ==
- Review by Robert M. Price (1983) in Crypt of Cthulhu, #18 Yuletide 1983
- Review by Dan Chow (1984) in Locus, #276 January 1984
- Review by Michael E. Stamm (1984) in SF & Fantasy Review, March 1984
- Review by David Sherman (1984) in Fangoria, April 1984
- Review by Don D'Ammassa (1986) in Science Fiction Chronicle, #76 January 1986
- Review by Darrell Schweitzer (1986) in Science Fiction Review, Spring 1986

== Film adaptation ==
The novella was adapted into a film, Silver Bullet, in 1985, starring Corey Haim as Marty, Everett McGill as Reverend Lowe, Gary Busey as Marty's uncle, Megan Follows as Marty's sister, Terry O'Quinn as the local sheriff, Kent Broadhurst as Brady's father, and James Gammon as Arnie Westrum. The movie received mixed reviews and it has since appeared on television regularly. In 1985, Signet Books re-issued Cycle of the Werewolf under the title Silver Bullet in an edition that included King's screenplay alongside the original novella. This edition also includes a foreword by King, recounting the impetus of the novella and the background of the film adaptation.
