= Silver Bullet (film) =

1985 film by Dan Attias

- Theatrical release poster
- Directed by: Dan Attias
- Written by: Stephen King
- Based on: Cycle of the Werewolf by Stephen King
- Produced by: Martha De Laurentiis
- Starring: Gary Busey; Everett McGill; Corey Haim
- Cinematography: Armando Nannuzzi
- Edited by: Daniel Loewenthal
- Music by: Jay Chattaway
- Production companies: Dino De Laurentiis Company; Famous Films
- Distributed by: Paramount Pictures
- Release date: October 11, 1985
- Running time: 95 minutes
- Country: United States
- Language: English
- Budget: $7 million
- Box office: $12.4 million or $5.4 million (North America)

Silver Bullet is a 1985 American horror film based on the 1983 Stephen King novella Cycle of the Werewolf. It stars Gary Busey, Everett McGill, and Corey Haim, with Megan Follows, Terry O'Quinn, Lawrence Tierney, Bill Smitrovich, Kent Broadhurst, David Hart, and James Gammon in supporting roles. The film is directed by Dan Attias, written by King and produced by Martha De Laurentiis.

== Plot ==
The rocky relationship between Jane Coslaw and her paraplegic younger brother, Marty, changes after a series of murders begin in their small rural town of Tarker's Mills, Maine, in the spring of 1976.

Railroad worker Arnie Westrum is decapitated by an unseen attacker. Pregnant Stella Randolph, preparing to kill herself, is brutally murdered in her bedroom along with her unborn baby. An abusive father, Milt Sturmfuller, is killed in his greenhouse, and Marty's best friend, Brady Kincaid, is also slain. Following Brady's death, the townspeople form a vigilante group. Despite Sheriff Joe Haller's attempts to stop them, he relents after Brady's father, Herb, angrily confronts him. Reverend Lester Lowe tries, but fails, to prevent the townsfolk from causing more bloodshed.

While the vigilantes hunt for the killer in the nearby woods, three of them are attacked and killed. The survivors — particularly Andy Fairton — later deny seeing anything unusual. Afterwards, Reverend Lowe dreams he is presiding over a mass funeral, only for the congregation — including the bodies in the caskets — to transform into werewolves and attack him. He wakes up screaming and pleads with God to "let it end."

As the unsolved murders continue to mount, curfews are put in place, canceling the fireworks for the town’s fair. The Coslaws decide to have their own backyard party and invite their mother Nan's alcoholic brother, Red. Red gifts Marty a custom-built wheelchair/motorcycle, which he nicknames the "Silver Bullet," along with a pile of fireworks for his own celebration. Marty sneaks out in the middle of the night to a bridge, where he lights the fireworks. The display draws the attention of the werewolf, who confronts Marty, but he escapes after firing a rocket into the creature's eye.

Marty enlists Jane's help to find someone with a newly injured or missing eye. She soon discovers that Reverend Lowe is missing his left eye. Knowing that no adult would believe his story, Marty sends anonymous notes to Reverend Lowe, telling him that he knows who and what he is, and that he should kill himself to stop the murders. In response, Lowe tries to run Marty off the road. When Marty becomes trapped under a covered bridge, the increasingly deranged Lowe attempts to justify the murders as doing God's work in eliminating sinners. Just as Lowe moves in for the kill, a passerby arrives, saving Marty.

The siblings manage to convince Red that Lowe is responsible for the murders and tried to kill Marty. Red persuades Sheriff Haller to investigate. That night, Haller, still skeptical but desperate, goes to Lowe's house, only to find the reverend has locked himself in his garage to prevent further killings. Before Haller can arrest him, Lowe transforms into a werewolf and kills Haller with a baseball bat.

Realizing the werewolf will come for them next, Marty and Jane convince Red to take Jane's silver cross and Marty's silver medallion to a gunsmith, who melts them down into a silver bullet.

On the night of the full moon, they wait for Lowe. He cuts the power to the house and breaks in, attacking Red. In the chaos, the silver bullet is nearly lost, but Marty retrieves it and shoots Lowe in his right eye. Lowe reverts to his human form before dying. As the trio recover, Marty and Jane embrace, with Jane narrating that although she had not always been able to express it, she could now tell Marty that she loved him.

== Cast ==
- Gary Busey as Uncle Red
- Everett McGill as Reverend Lester Lowe
- Corey Haim as Marty Coslaw
- Megan Follows as Jane Coslaw
- Terry O'Quinn as Sheriff Joe Haller
- Bill Smitrovich as Andy Fairton
- Robin Groves as Nan Coslaw
- Leon Russom as Bob Coslaw
- Lawrence Tierney as Owen Knopfler
- Kent Broadhurst as Herb Kincaid
- Heather Simmons as Tammy Sturmfuller
- James A. Baffico as Milt Sturmfuller
- James Gammon as Arnie Westrum

In addition, Joe Wright plays Brady Kincaid, Marty's best friend, while Tovah Feldshuh provides the narration as the voice of the adult Jane.

== Production ==
The film was shot around Wilmington, North Carolina and Burgaw, North Carolina. The Sunken Gardens, alongside Greenfield Lake were some of the locations utilized for the film. Two different churches were used for filming with the Zion United Methodist Church in Leland and the Holy Ghost Deliverance Tabernacle of Prayer for the werewolf church sequence. Don Coscarelli was considered to direct and collaborate on the script. He wrote a first draft with Sergio Altieri that producer Dino de Laurentiis did not like. King arrived to discuss the project a day later and later faxed some notes that apparently were helpful. However, de Laurentiis, who called Coscarelli in when the notes were faxed, rejected the notes out of hand, which led to Coscarelli dropping out.

Filming began in October 1984 and took about 2 1/2 months to complete, finishing shortly before Christmas. In the novella, the werewolf was said to snarl in nearly human words and the werewolf was supposed to speak in the original screenplay, although this was eliminated after a rewrite. Gary Busey felt a certain kinship with the Uncle Red character and was allowed to ad lib all of his lines in certain takes of each scene in which he appeared. Although he read the lines as scripted in most of the takes, Stephen King and Daniel Attias liked the ad lib scenes better and decided to include most of Busey's ad lib scenes in the final cut of the film.

King asked for the werewolf to be plain and hard to see in contrast to the hulking monsters seen in other werewolf films and books in the early to mid-1980s. The result was less than satisfactory ending up as a creature which looked more like an American black bear and did not really have any identifying werewolf characteristics prompting some people to call it a "werebear." After seeing Carlo Rambaldi's design, per King's request, producer Dino de Laurentiis was very unhappy and demanded a change, which both King and Rambaldi refused. When pressured to either cancel the film or accept the design de Laurentiis relented and allowed filming to continue with Rambaldi's werewolf suit. A modern dance actor was hired to perform the stunts inside the suit but de Laurentiis was also unhappy with his performance and demanded a change. As a result, Everett McGill, who played Reverend Lester Lowe in human form, wound up acting out most of the scenes in the werewolf suit and was credited with a dual role.

== Release ==
Silver Bullet was released theatrically in the United States by Paramount Pictures in October 1985. It grossed $12,361,866 at the box office.

== Home media ==
The film was released on DVD by Paramount Home Entertainment in 2002, on Blu-ray in Germany on September 14, 2017, under the name Der Werwolf von Tarker-Mills. Then on Blu-ray in Australia on January 3, 2018, by Umbrella Entertainment, and on Blu-ray from Scream Factory on December 17, 2019. A 4K Ultra HD Blu-ray was released by Scream Factory on December 5, 2023.

== Reception ==
On the review aggregator website Rotten Tomatoes, 46% of 26 critics' reviews are positive. Metacritic, which uses a weighted average, assigned the film a score of 26 out of 100, based on 7 critics, indicating "generally unfavorable" reviews.

Roger Ebert gave the film three stars out of four. Ebert admitted that he thought that the film was a parody of the novella and of King's work in general, but said that he enjoyed the film. Conversely, Vincent Canby of The New York Times dismissed the film as "very low-grade Stephen King fiction" and thought the werewolf "looks less like a wolf than Smokey Bear with a terrible hangover." Variety wrote, "Silver Bullet is a Stephen King filmette from his scriptette from his novelette which may sell some tickettes but not without regrettes ... the kids have a silver bullet, the only known power that will stop a werewolf. Unfortunately, there's no known power that will stop films like this."

Rick Kogan of the Chicago Tribune gave the film one star out of four and called it "a limp retelling of the werewolf legend that is about as frightening as a rubbery Richard Nixon mask." Michael Wilmington of the Los Angeles Times wrote, "The human drama gives Silver Bullet an extra warmth—and Marty's handicap and ingenuity make him a more attractive hero. But, with the exception of one startling dream sequence (a church congregation in mass vulpine metamorphosis), Silver Bullet never really surprises you." Paul Attanasio of The Washington Post remarked that the plot "is about as suspenseful as looking at your watch to see which minute will pop up next," but Gary Busey's lively performance "almost makes the movie bearable."

In a retrospective review, Felix Vasquez Jr. of Film Threat and Cinema Crazed wrote, "Silver Bullet features one of the best climaxes in a horror film thanks to director Daniel Attias, and garners a very entertaining and creepy story that develops beyond a typical werewolf movie. When I think of great horror films, when I think of great werewolf films, and when I think of a great King film, I think of this."
