= Million Mask March =

Protest associated with the hacktivist group Anonymous

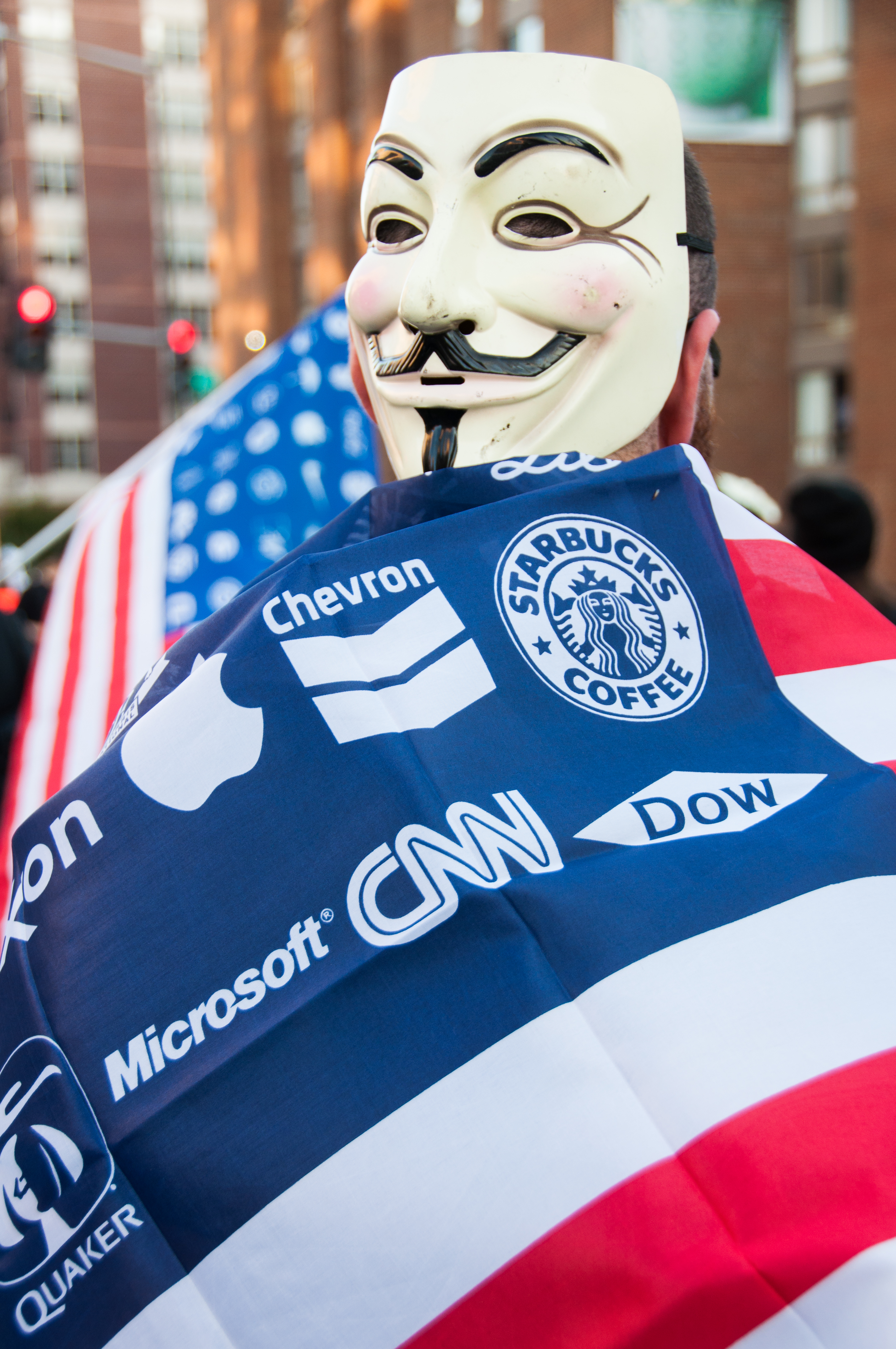
A protester wears a Guy Fawkes mask during the 2015 Million Mask March in Washington, D.C.

The Million Mask March, also known as "Operation Vendetta", is a worldwide, annual protest associated with the hacktivist group Anonymous occurring annually on Guy Fawkes Day, 5 November. The motive for the March varies, but includes some consistent themes prevalent in the Anonymous movement, including: corruption in politics, demilitarization, police violence, and self-governance. The marches are set in motion to allow ordinary citizens to collaborate in order to create societal change through alterations to their governments. They are coordinated through a host of channels with most prevalent being word of mouth and social media. Hundreds of Facebook events and dedicated Twitter accounts are used to advertise the protest around the world.

== History ==
Anonymous, originally a group of internet forum users, first came into political activism from its battle against Scientology, referred to as Project Chanology. This culminated in a worldwide protest outside of Scientology churches across the globe.

The first Million Mask March occurred in 2012; the largest events occurred in London and Washington, DC, with smaller scale events across the globe, usually outside of government buildings.

== Symbolism ==
Protesters at the Million Mask March frequently wear versions of the Guy Fawkes mask in homage to the graphic novel V for Vendetta. The costume references the novel, where the protagonist wages war against an authoritarian dystopia in the UK. In the film rendition, millions of masks are distributed to citizens who gather around the parliament.

== Events ==
- London, UK: The march became an annual occurrence in London. Protesters marched through central London on 5 November 2015 in protest of the manner in which the British government conducts surveillance on the country, the suspected corruption that they believe has become ingrained in government, and their dissatisfaction with the State's socio-economic issues. During the 2016 protest, 53 protesters were arrested during the march through Central London which were related to drug use, destruction of property and other criminal activity. The march did not officially take place on 5 November 2026, with "virtually nobody" attending.
- Manila, Philippines: Activists linked to the hacktivism group Anonymous crashed 30 of the Filipino government's websites in response to the corruption felt toward politicians. The group released a video apologizing to the people of the Philippines for the disruption and courting them to protest in front of the parliament house on 6 November 2013.
