= Privacy at the Margins =

2020 book by Scott Skinner-Thompson

- Author: Scott Skinner-Thompson
- Subject: privacy law
- Genre: legal scholarship
- Published: 2020
- Publisher: Cambridge University Press
- Awards: 2020 Gamm Justice Award
- ISBN: 978-1-107-18137-3
- OCLC: 1196819818

Privacy at the Margins is a book published by law professor Scott Skinner-Thompson on Cambridge University Press in 2020. The book contributes to a growing field of legal scholarship on privacy and inequality, especially for minorities, and uses a queer and intersectional feminist epistemology to describe the effects privacy violations have on people living at the margins of society.

== Summary ==
Skinner-Thompson addresses the different ways privacy or the lack of privacy affects racial minorities, queer communities, women, people who are economically disadvantaged, and religious minorities. These minorities are both more likely to experience privacy invasions and the effects of such invasions are more devastating for them than for majority groups in society.

Privacy at the Margins starts by stating that privacy is often not prioritised in courts of law or as a legislative priority, but it is extremely important for people in marginalized communities. The book aims to "provide solutions in the form of legal theories or frames for privacy that will better advance the privacy rights of marginalized communities in courts and society."

The book aims to do this in three ways:

1. By explaining how seemingly benign laws and norms violates the privacy of vulnerable groups causing disproportionate harm to them. An example is the targeting of minorities for surveillance."
2. By scrutinizing aspects of privacy law that cause this and analyzing how legal theories have not sufficiently considered the unequal effects of privacy.
3. By suggesting alternative legal theories and rhetorical frames for improving this.

The book thus seeks to transform privacy "from a liberal, individualistic value into an anti-oppression legal tool."." The "secrecy paradigm" in US law presumes privacy to be irrelevant if your activities are exposed to anyone else, for instance if you walk out your front door, or have shared a photo with another person. This harms marginalized groups disproportionately because they are less likely to own their own spaces and more likely to be required to share personal information, for example due to targeted surveillance.

Skinner-Thompson argues that in addition to seeing privacy rights protected by the Fourth Amendment to the United States Constitution, which prevents unreasonable searches, we should also see privacy as performative, as acts of expression. This would mean privacy was covered by the First Amendment, the right to free speech. Examples could include wearing hoodies or masks to avoid being surveilled (see anti-mask laws) as well as digital equivalents like using VPNs or the Tor network. Case studies discussed include the Black Lives Matter movement.

Jessica Silbey calls Privacy at the Margins a fourth-generation study on privacy law. The first generation established privacy as something to be protected. The second discussed its legal and constitutional variations, the third addressed the changing nature of privacy in the digital age. The fourth generation, according to Silbey, addresses privacy law and equality as it intersects with gender, race, sexual orientation and economic class.

== Author ==
Scott Skinner-Thompson is a professor of law at the University of Colorado Law School. He began working on Privacy at the Margins while doing research for the American Civil Liberties Union on whether state constitutional privacy law could be used to challenge laws limiting peoples’ ability to change their gender markers on government identification documents. This led him to consider how reduced privacy rights impacted many intersectional, marginalized groups.

== Reviews ==
Reviewers praised the book for novel ideas and strong arguments, but several noted that it is highly specific to the US context and requires readers to have knowledge of US constitutional law.

Julien Rossi's review of the book for the European Data Protection Law Review argues that although the legal framework may seem quite foreign to European readers, its defence of privacy for marginalized communities is powerful. Rossi notes that some of Skinner-Thompson's arguments may seem far-fetched, such as the proposal of defining privacy as an act of speech; however, this argument addresses practical goals given the US court system. Rossi also writes that Skinner-Thompson tends to dismiss privacy theories that have actually been successful in strengthening privacy and data protection rights in Europe.

Xiaoxiao Meng's review for Information, Communication, and Society highlights the book's blending of legal studies and critical scholarship on surveillance and marginalized groups, and writes that this "intellectual cocktail" is a potent mix.

Jenneke Evers calls the book "excellent", though, she notes, some arguments are US-focused. She writes that it would help readers of the book to be familiar with US constitutional law or US civil rights law, and that the book also engages with surveillance studies, critical data studies and critical theory. Evers describes the two most strongest points in the book as 1) the notion of privacy as performative and 2) the argument that marginalizated people encounter more surveillance and thus have to share more data than more privileged groups.

In her 39-page review of the book for Constitutional Commentary, Jessica Silbey writes that she finds the doctrinal pathways Skinner-Thompson proposes intriguing through not entirely convincing, and compliments the narratives he tells about cases where privacy has impacted minorities forceful in their "clarity and recontextualization". She takes issue with some of his arguments, not because she disagrees with the intended outcomes but because she is more cynical about the Supreme Court's lack of concern for enhancing freedom or equality for vulnerable people or communities. Silby also presents her own analysis of cases to make this point.

== Awards ==
- 2020 Gamm Justice Award from the University of Colorado.
