= Anti-mask law =

Laws against concealing one's face in public

Anti-mask or anti-masking laws are legislative or penal initiatives prohibiting the concealment of one's face in public. Anti-mask laws vary widely between jurisdictions in their intent, scope, and penalties.

== Impact of the COVID-19 pandemic ==
During the COVID-19 pandemic, jurisdictions with pre-existing anti-mask laws exempted their mandates on face coverings from such laws, at least in practice.

== By country ==
Countries with anti-mask bans as of 2025: Ban in public places Full or partial ban in some localities Ban on sale and manufacturing Ban in some public buildings or in the public workplace

=== North America ===
==== United States ====
There are anti-mask laws in many U.S. states and the District of Columbia.

- Many anti-mask laws date back to the mid-20th century, when states and municipalities passed them to stop the violent activities of the Ku Klux Klan, whose members typically wore hoods of white linen to conceal their identities.
- In the 21st century those laws have been applied to political protesters such as those affiliated with the Occupy Movement or Anonymous – wearing Guy Fawkes masks.

These laws have been challenged on the grounds that they violate the guarantees of the First Amendment to the United States Constitution to free speech and free association. Some courts have weighed freedom of speech against the public safety interest, and upheld such laws. For example, the Georgia Supreme Court found the law constitutional on the grounds that the wearing of the mask was an act of intimidation and a threat of violence, which is not protected speech. That law has exceptions for holiday celebrations, theatre performances, and occupational safety; the ruling makes it unclear if someone is violating the law if they wear a mask without the intent to threaten violence. A three-judge panel of the United States Court of Appeals for the Second Circuit upheld a New York law on the ground that wearing a Ku Klux Klan mask did not convey a protected message beyond that conveyed by wearing a hood and robe. Other courts have struck down anti-mask laws. For example, Tennessee and Florida state laws have been invalidated on the grounds that they were unconstitutionally broad. An ordinance in Goshen, Indiana, was struck down based on First Amendment doctrine that specifically protects anonymous speech and anonymous association, especially for unpopular groups like the KKK. The book Privacy on the Margins discusses how the use of masks can be a performative act of speech and thus protected by the first amendment.

===== California =====
In September 2025, California passed a law that prohibits local and federal law enforcement from wearing face masks while conducting operations. The law was passed as a response to the use of face masks by Immigrations and Customs Enforcement (ICE) during enforcement operations.

===== New York =====
New York State's anti-mask law was enacted in 1845, to provide for public safety after disputes between landlords and tenants. Since 2024, a number of counties in the state have implemented or considered reintroducing the pre-COVID anti-mask law. Nassau County implemented its current anti-mask law in August 2024 although there are exception for health and religious reasons.

==== Canada ====
- After several high-profile protests, the Canadian Parliament introduced Bill C-309, which bans the wearing of masks during a riot or other unlawful assembly. The bill became law on June 19, 2013.
- Canada's Criminal Code, Section 351(2), also covers "Disguise with Intent", whereby "Every one who, with intent to commit an indictable offence, has his face masked or coloured or is otherwise disguised is guilty of an indictable offence and liable to imprisonment for a term not exceeding ten years". With some exceptions, an indictable offence in Canada is one that is subject to a fine of greater than $5,000 or imprisonment of more than six months.
- In 2017 a Quebec ban on face covering for transition and government services became publicized.

=== Europe ===
The present table provides a non-exhaustive overview comparing legal restrictions of face coverings in European states. The 2010 French ban on face covering is widely regarded as the most strict, prohibiting face coverings in almost all situations in public places, as opposed to limited restrictions in countries such as Denmark that only outlaws such practices in the context of public assemblies such as demonstrations.

Legal restrictions on face covering in Europe
State	Since	Limitations (examples)	Situations	Exceptions	Notes
Austria	2002, 2017	motorcycle full face helmets or face-covering scarves	Demonstrations, universities, public transportation or courthouses	Face covering for doing one's job	
Belgium	2011	Burqas, niqabs and other masks	In public (unspecified)		Upheld by the ECtHR in 2017
Bulgaria	2016	Burqas, niqabs or other face-covering veils	Government offices, schools, cultural institutions and places of public recreation	Exceptions are allowed for health or professional reasons	National ban was preceded by local bans in Bulgarian towns
Denmark	2000	Hoods, masks, painting or objects that cover one's face and are worn in a way where it prevents identification	Public assemblies	Masking to protect one's face against the weather or worn for another worthy purpose	Does not apply in Greenland or the Faroe Islands
France	2010	Burqas, niqābs, motorcycle full face helmets, balaclavas, hoods and other face-covering veils	Public places	Full face helmets worn on motorcycles	Upheld by the ECtHR in 2014
Germany	1985	Items suitable and intended to prevent identification	Open-air public assemblies or other open-air public events or on the way there	Competent authorities may provide exemptions if there is no threat to public safety or public order	
Italy	1975	Any mask or clothing that obstructs identification	In public (unspecified)	Exceptions are allowed for a "justified cause"	There are disagreements whether one's religion is a "justified cause"
Netherlands	2019	Burqas, niqabs, motorcycle full face helmets, balaclavas	Public transport, in buildings and associated yards of educational, governmental and healthcare institutions	Face covering for doing one's job or sport, for health or security, in healthcare residences	In force since 1 August 2019
Latvia	2016?	Hoods, masks, burqas, niqabs or objects to cover one's face	Public places		Islamic face veil to be banned in Latvia
Norway	1995	Masks (unspecified)	Public events such as demonstrations, marches, meetings, stands or similar		
Spain	2013	Face-coverings (unspecified)	Public demonstrations		
Sweden	2005	Face-coverings (unspecified) that complicate identification	Public demonstrations where public order is or may be disturbed	Does not apply to religion-motivated face-coverings, or when demonstrators are authorised to cover their faces	
Switzerland	2021	Burqas, niqabs or other face-covering veils		Masks worn for medical reasons	

Anti-mask laws in Europe as of 2025: National ban – country bans wearing full-face veils in public Local ban – cities or regions ban full-face veils Partial ban – government bans full-face veils in some locations

==== Austria ====
In Austria since 2002, masking ban on demonstrations under § 9 of the Assembly Law (Versammlungsgesetz). Violation of the ban need not be prosecuted if the mask does not threaten public order and security. Violation of the ban entails, according to § 19a.b of the Law, imprisonment up to six months, repeated offenses one year or a fine.

Parliament approved new legislation on 16 May 2017, which stipulates that people who wear clothing that covers their faces, such as burqas, niqabs, full face helmets or scarves (motorcyclists) etc. in places like universities, public transportation or courthouses will face fines of 150 euros (about $167). The measure took effect in October 2017. Shortly after the enactment on 1 October 2017, there were some incidents in which people were incorrectly fined by the police, leading some commentators to point out flaws in the law, or incorrect understanding of it amongst the police.

==== Belgium ====
A Belgian law adopted in June 2011 prohibits appearing in public "with a face masked or hidden, in whole or in part, in such a way as to be unidentifiable". Violations can result in fines and up to seven days in jail. On 11 July 2017 the ban in Belgium was upheld by the European Court of Human Rights (ECHR) after having been challenged by two Muslim women who claimed their rights had been infringed.

==== Denmark ====
Wearing masks or other objects that cover the face in a way where identification is prevented during assemblies in a public place is illegal in Denmark. The Danish Penal Code § 134 b, effective from 3 June 2000, makes the violation punishable by a fine or up to six months imprisonment. Part 2 of § 134 b further criminalizes the possession of effects which must be viewed as intended to be used for masking in an assembly. The §134 b, part 3, exempts from penalty masking which is done to protect one's face against the weather or worn for another worthy purpose. The ban does not apply in the autonomous territories of Greenland or the Faroe Islands.

==== France ====
The French ban on face covering is an act of parliament passed by the Senate of France on 14 September 2010, resulting in the ban on the wearing of face-covering headgear, including masks, helmets, balaclava, niqābs and other veils covering the face in public places, except under specified circumstances.

==== Germany ====
Since 1985, according to § 17a Abs. 2 Versammlungsgesetz it is prohibited to disguise one's identity in public meetings such as demonstrations so as to prevent identification by police. This violation can be fined with imprisonment up to one year.

==== Italy ====
In Italy, a law issued in 1975 strictly forbids wearing of any attire that could hide the face of a person. Penalties (fines and imprisonment) are provided for such behaviour. The original purpose of the anti-mask law was to prevent crime or terrorism. The law allows for exemptions for a "justified cause", which has sometimes been interpreted by courts as including religious reasons for wearing a veil, but others –including local governments– disagree and claim religion is not a "justified cause" in this context.

==== Latvia ====
In Latvia, a law issued in 2016 to ban niqab and burqa in entire country was passed by Latvian parliament.

==== Netherlands ====
In the Netherlands, a first attempt towards a partial prohibition on face covering was made from 2012 to 2015, but the bill was struck down. A new attempt was made in the years after when a new bill was submitted on 27 November 2015. Eventually a limited anti-mask law was passed on 26 June 2018. The law is called Instelling van een gedeeltelijk verbod op het dragen van gezichtsbedekkende kleding in het onderwijs, het openbaar vervoer, overheidsgebouwen en de zorg (Wet gedeeltelijk verbod gezichtsbedekkende kleding) ("Introduction of a partial ban on the wearing of face-covering clothing in education, public transport, governmental buildings and healthcare (Partial Face-Covering Clothing Ban Act)"). It is illegal to wear clothing which covers the entire face, or covered up to the point where only the eyes are uncovered, or renders the face unrecognisable, on public transport and in buildings and associated yards of educational institutions, governmental institutions and healthcare institutions. Frequently cited examples are a full face helmet, a balaclava, a burqa or a niqāb. Clothes exempt from the Act are:

- those worn by clients, patients or their visitors in residential parts of healthcare institutions;
- those necessary for the protection of the body in relation to health or security;
- those necessary in relation to the requirements made to the performance of a profession or sport.

On 26 June 2018, the bill was passed in the Dutch Senate.

==== Norway ====
Concealment of faces in public is legal in Norway, except when taking part in a public event.

Exempted from the prohibition of concealment in public events are participants in theatre, masquerade or similar. In accordance with the Norwegian police law, violation is punishable by a fine or up to three months imprisonment.

==== Russia ====
According to a Russian federal law "On assemblies, meetings, demonstrations, marches and picketing", Article 6 as of June 2012:

- it is prohibited to wear masks and "any other means of hiding identity during public events;
- the organizer of an event must require all the people taking part not to use any means of hiding identity.

The punishment for the violation of the given law was introduced in July 2014 and is provided by the federal code on administrative offences.

==== Spain ====
According to the November 2013 Citizens' Security Law (Ley mordaza), demonstration protesters who cover their faces may be fined up to €30,000.

==== Sweden ====
According to the 2005 'Law on the Prohibition of masking in some cases', it is prohibited for participants in the demonstration to fully or partially cover the face in a way that complicates identification. This prohibition applies only if there are disturbances of public order at demonstrations, or if there is an immediate danger of such disturbances. The ban does not apply to the covering of the face for religious reasons. It also does not apply to the extent participants are authorized (under 2 Ch. 7 a § Order Act) to fully or partially cover the face.

==== Switzerland ====
In the cantons of Basel-Stadt (1990), Zurich (1995), Bern (1999), Lucerne (2004), Thurgau (2004), Solothurn (2006) and St. Gallen (2009), there are laws banning use of masks.

In a referendum on 7 March 2021, Swiss voters approved a nationwide ban on face concealment, with over 51% of the electorate supporting it.

==== Ukraine ====
Several days after Berkut riot police clashed with Euromaidan protesters, Verkhovna Rada enacted law 721-VII banning wearing masks, helmets or camouflage clothing by people taking part in a gathering, assembly, demonstration, protest, rally or other mass event. Fines for violating are monetary up to about $400 or administrative arrest up to 15 days. The law was repealed in January 2014.

==== United Kingdom ====
For a century, covering or blacking one's face was a criminal act that could lead to the death penalty; the 1723 Black Act was repealed in 1823.

=== Asia-Pacific ===
==== Australia ====
It is legal to wear a mask in public in Australia. Motorcycle riders wearing full face helmets are generally required to remove them when entering a bank. A judge in New South Wales has ruled that a woman cannot give evidence in a niqāb. A Victorian judge extended the ban to wearing a niqāb in the public gallery.

- In Victoria, The participants of a violence disorder to cover their face in order to conceal the participant's identity or to protect the participant from the effects of a crowd-controlling substance will result in a higher imprisoned period from 10 years to 15 years.
- New South Wales police can require a motorist to remove head coverings, including masks, for identification purposes.

==== Hong Kong ====
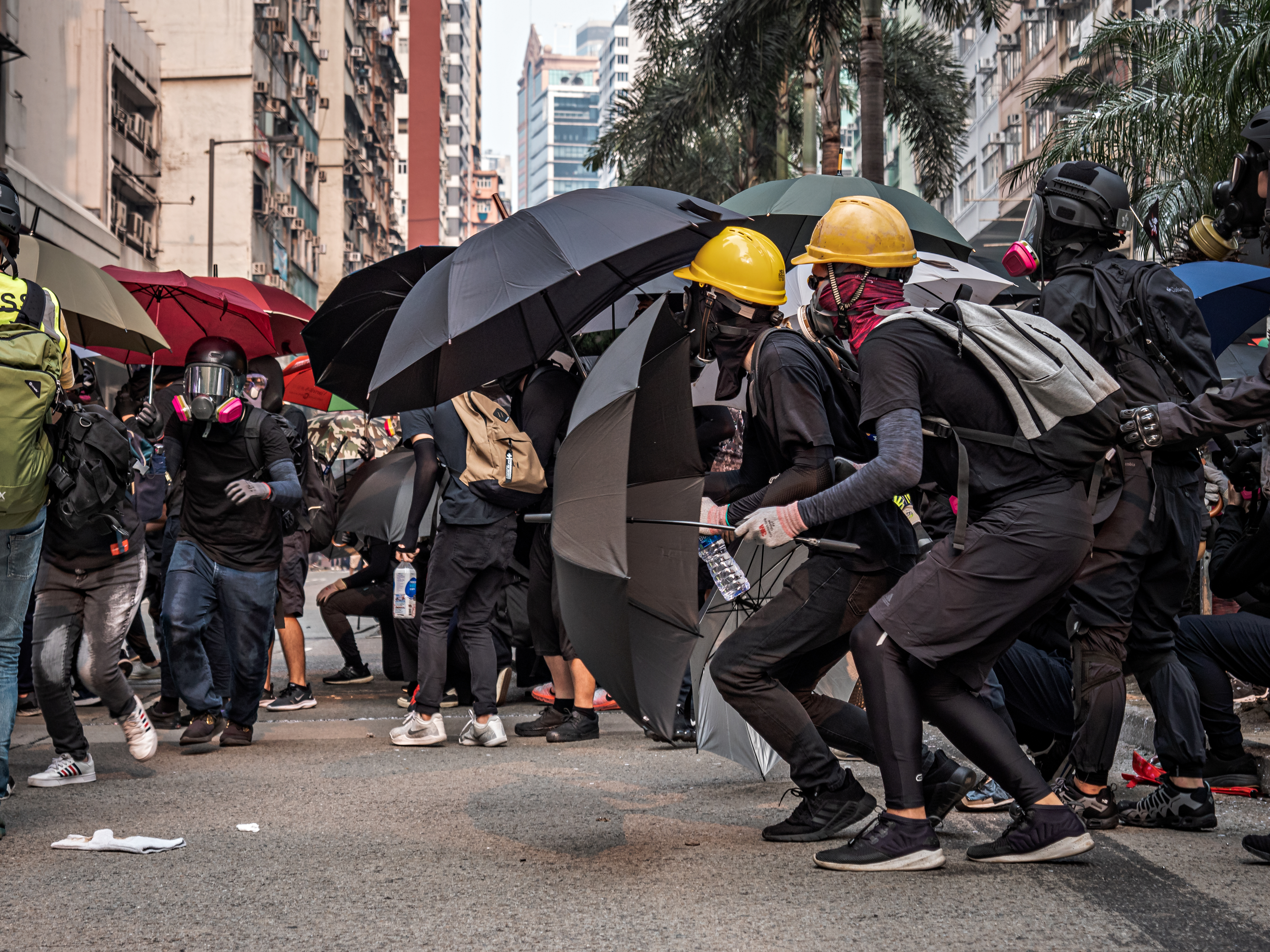
On 4 October 2019, the HKSAR Government invoked the Emergency Regulations Ordinance to implement an anti-mask law in response to the ongoing protest.

On 4 October 2019, the Government of Hong Kong invoked the rarely used colonial-era Emergency Regulations Ordinance to implement the Prohibition on Face Covering Regulation (PFCR), an anti-mask law in response to the ongoing protest that year. The law bans protesters from covering their faces whether in full or partially during protests, including at rallies given a "Letter of No Objection" under the Public Order Ordinance. Anyone who wears a mask at a lawful rally or march, unlawful or unauthorised assembly, or during a riot could be sentenced to up to a year in jail and a fine of HK$25,000. Exemptions include those at protests wearing masks for professional or paid work, or for religious or medical reasons.

In addition, the law states that anyone who disobeys a police order to remove a mask could be sentenced to six months in jail and a HK$10,000 fine. Paint is also included in the definition of "face-covering". The legislation went into effect from midnight on 5 October until further notice, and the Hong Kong High Court refused to rule out an interim injunction order but the court will later decide whether to allow a judicial review into the invocation of the Emergency Regulations Ordinance.

In response to the government's implementation of the law, netizens widely shared a speech by Edward Leung in a televised debate during the 2016 Legco election, "A few years ago, Ukraine passed an anti-mask law. Do you know what happened in Ukraine? A revolution started in Ukraine. You want to do it? Do it, we will fight till the end."

===== Judicial review =====
On 18 November 2019, the High Court ruled s3(1)(b), (c), (d) and s5 of the PFCR failed the proportionality test as they placed restrictions on fundamental rights beyond intended goals. The judgement levelled criticism at various aspects including: the lack of a declared state of emergency to justify invoking the ERO, the law applies to both unlawful and lawful gatherings, the lack of a mechanism to distinguish the two, and the unwarranted breadth of the 'stop and unmask' power granted to police.

The court also ruled that the ERO sections empowering the Chief-Executive-in Council to make laws "on any occasion of public danger" is incompatible with multiple articles of the Hong Kong Basic Law, however, constitutional status is open to question. The court also held the ordinance meets the "prescribed by law" requirement.

In response, the government said that it would stop enforcing the ban for the time being. A spokesman from the Chinese legislative affairs commission, however, stated that "Whether the laws of the Hong Kong Special Administrative Region comply with the Basic Law of Hong Kong can only be judged and decided by the standing committee of the National People's Congress".

On 22 November 2019, the High Court made the following remark:

"Nevertheless, we recognise that our Judgment is only a judgment at first instance, and will soon be subject to an appeal to the Court of Appeal. In view of the great public importance of the issues raised in this case, and the highly exceptional circumstances that Hong Kong is currently facing, we consider it right that we should grant a short interim suspension order so that the respondents may have an opportunity to apply to the Court of Appeal, if so advised, for such interim relief as may be appropriate. Accordingly, we shall grant an interim temporary suspension order to postpone the coming into operation of the declarations of invalidity for a period of 7 days up to the end of 29 November 2019, with liberty to apply."

On 26 November 2019, the High Court announced hearing for the government appeal against the judgement is on 9 January 2020.

On 27 November 2019, the Court of Appeal extended the interim suspension of the judgment until 10 December 2019.

On 10 December 2019, the Court of Appeal refused to suspend the "unconstitutional" ruling by the Court of First Instance on the anti-mask regulation. A full hearing was scheduled to commence on 9 January 2020.

On 21 December 2020, it was ruled by the Court of Final Appeal that the prohibition on the use of face coverings was constitutional.

== See also ==
- Surveillance
- Niqāb § Enforcement, encouragement and bans
- Zentai
- Islamophobia
- Face masks during the COVID-19 pandemic
- First Amendment Encyclopedia
