= Kent Broadhurst =

American actor (1940–2026)

- Born: James Kent Broadhurst; February 4, 1940; St. Louis, Missouri, U.S.
- Died: May 20, 2026 (aged 86); New York City, U.S.
- Occupations: Actor, playwright, screenwriter and painter

James Kent Broadhurst (February 4, 1940 — May 20, 2026) was an American actor, playwright, screenwriter and painter.

== Career ==
He appeared in a number of off-Broadway and regional theater productions. Broadhurst has also acted in films, including The Verdict, Silkwood, and Silver Bullet, and in television productions including Babylon 5, Law & Order, and War and Remembrance. As a live performer, Broadhurst provided the on-stage narration in the role of the hypnotherapist in progressive metal band Dream Theater's New York City performance of Metropolis Pt. 2: Scenes from a Memory, beginning in 2000. This performance was documented in the band's DVD Metropolis 2000: Scenes from New York.

His credits as a playwright include They're Coming To Make It Brighter, Lemons, The Eye of the Beholder, and The Habitual Acceptance of the Near Enough, all first produced at the Humana Festival at the Actors Theatre of Louisville. He wrote the screenplay for the 2001 television film Wild Iris.

== Personal life ==
Broadhurst was born in St. Louis, Missouri on February 4, 1940. He graduated from the University of Nebraska in 1962, and lived in New York.

Broadhurst died on May 20, 2026, at the age of 86.

== Gallery ==
Examples of Broadhurst's work as a painter:

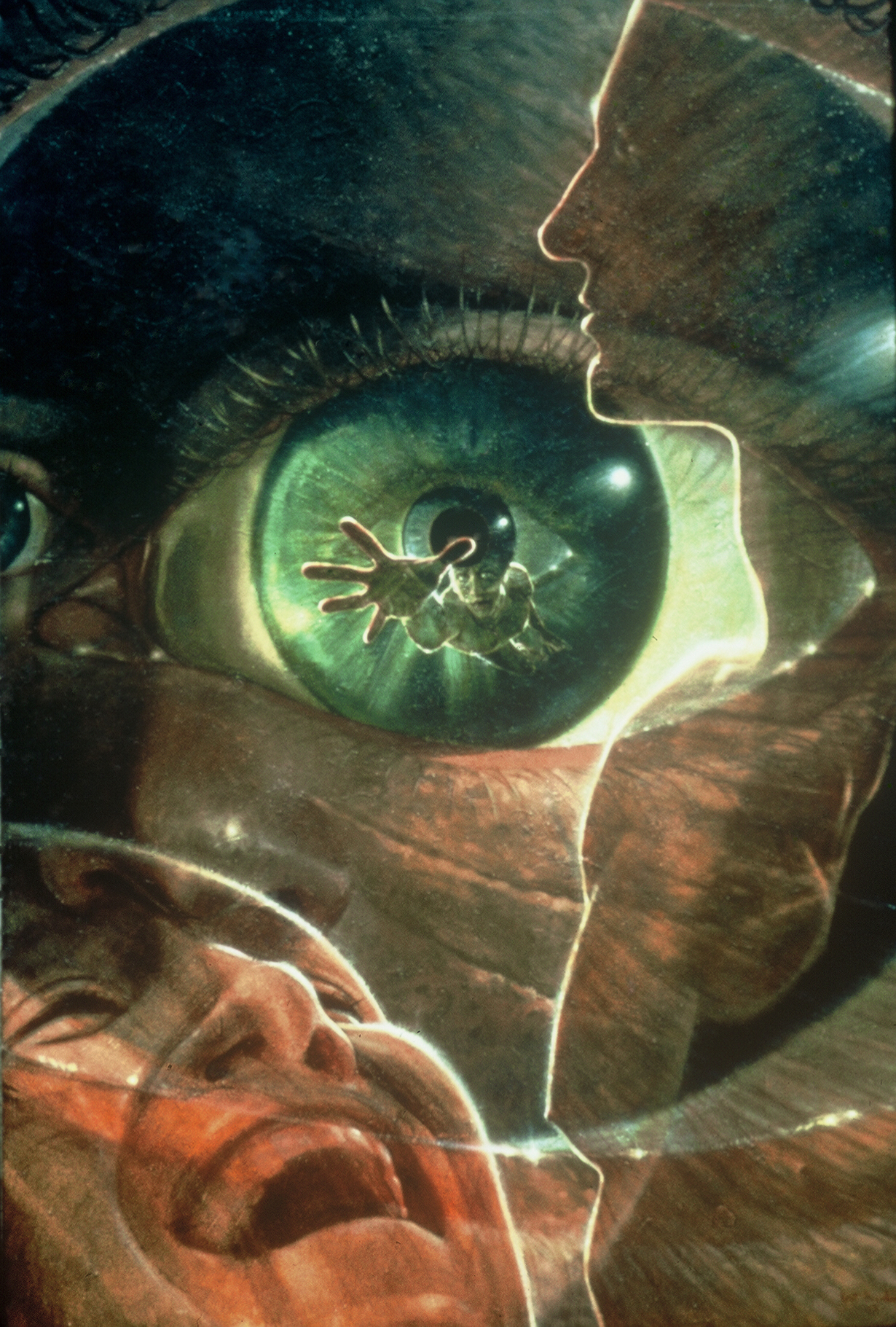
At 30
(1970)

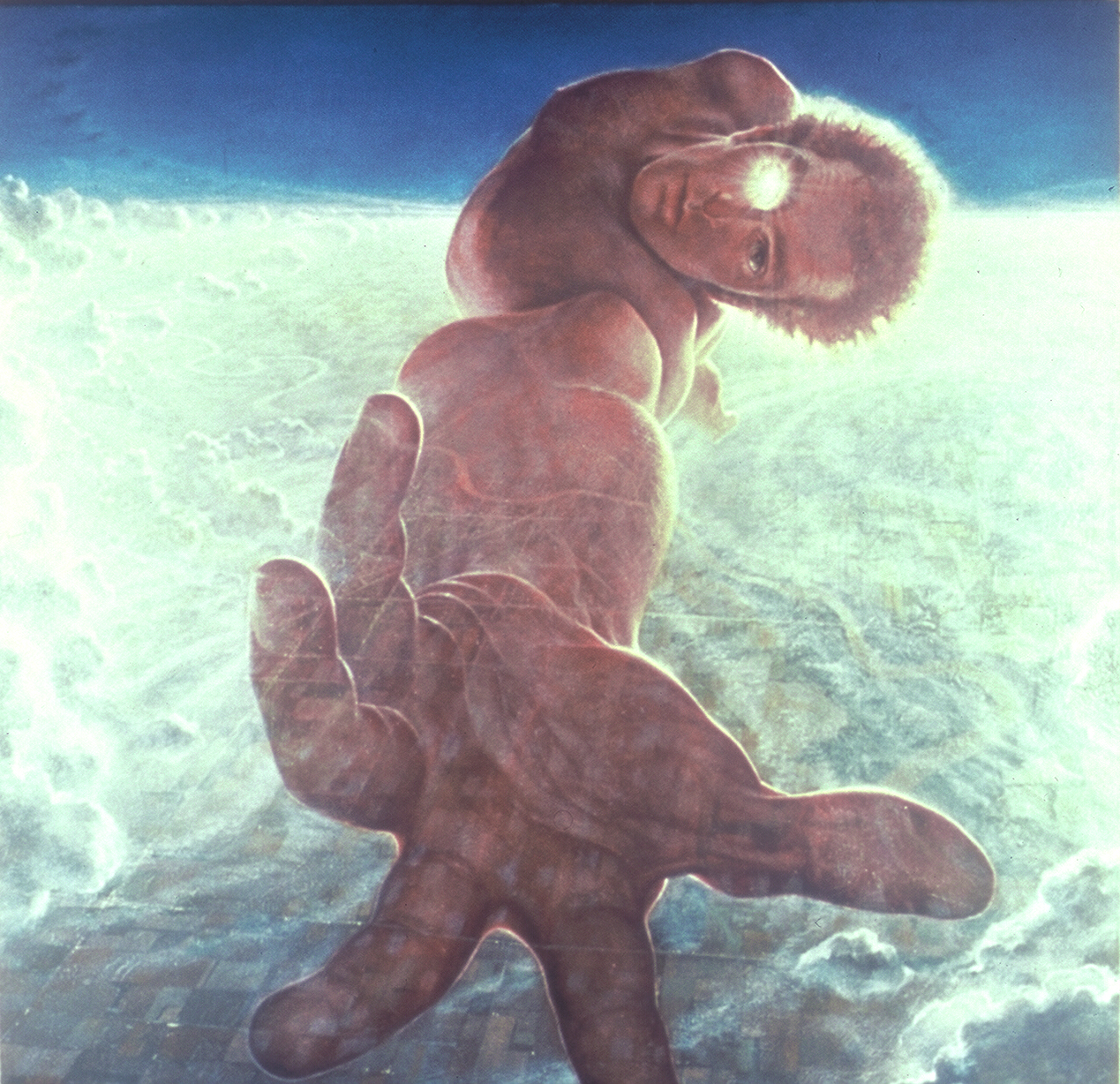
Traveling Light
(1970)

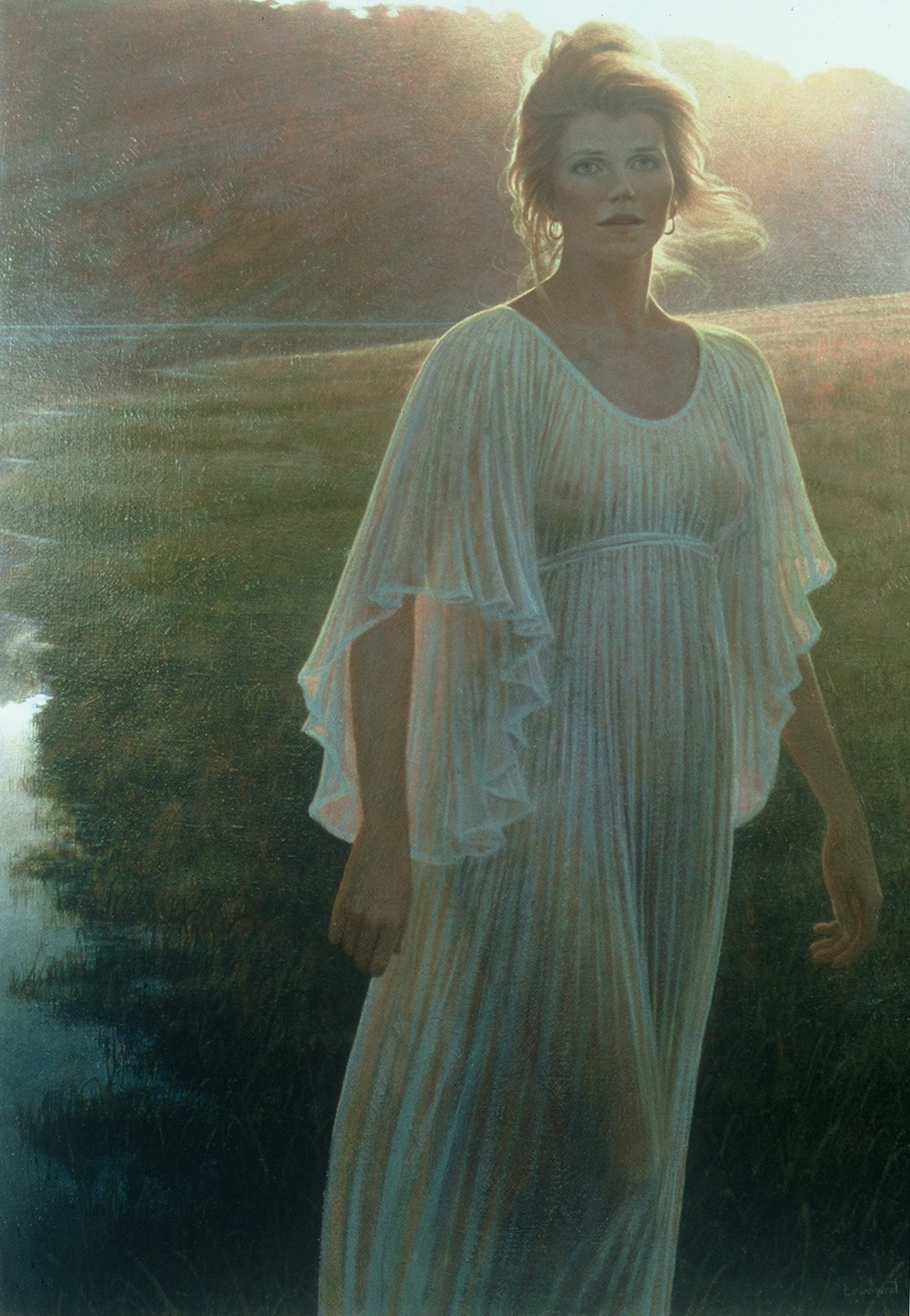
Jennifer Warren
(1976)

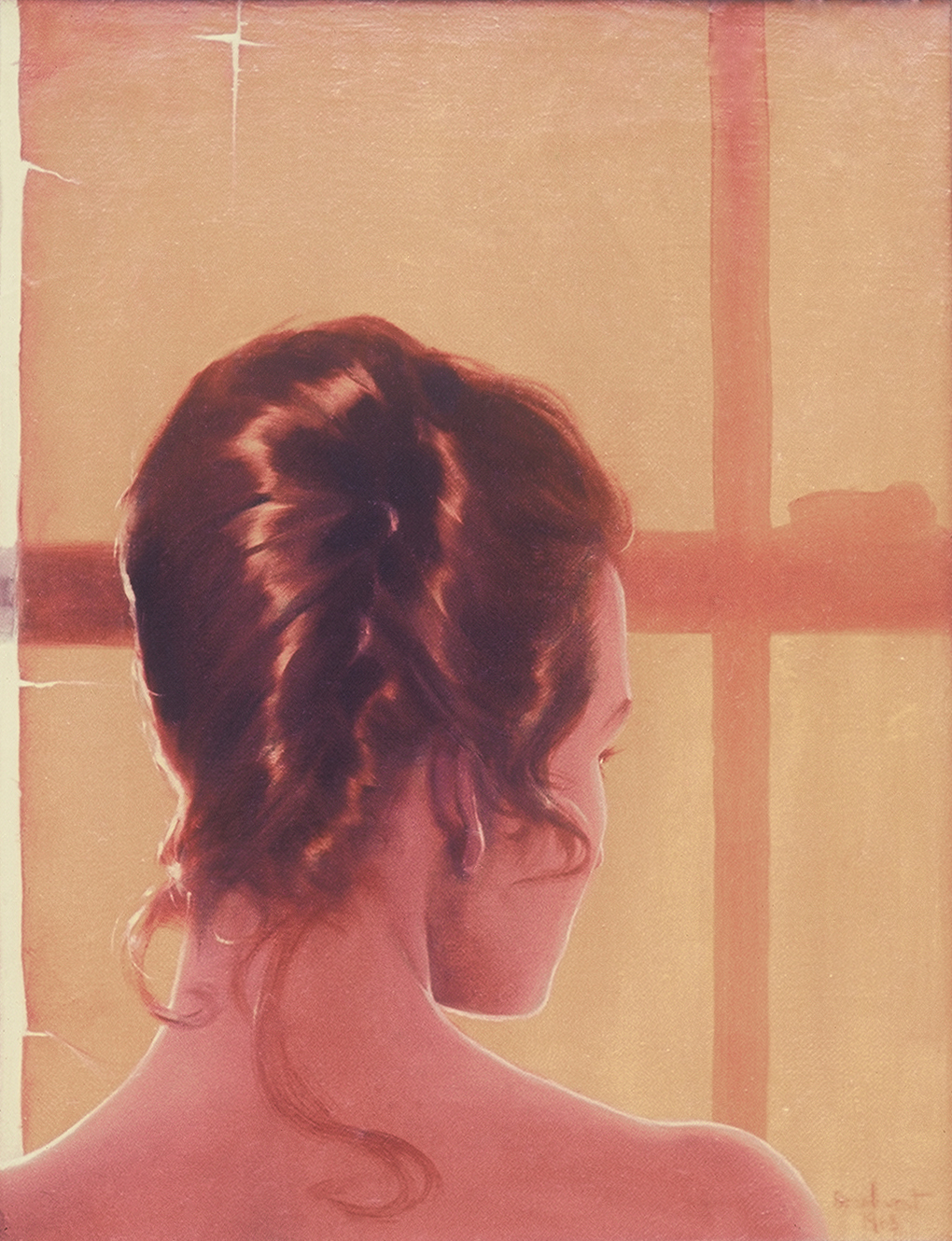
Kythera by a Window
(1967)

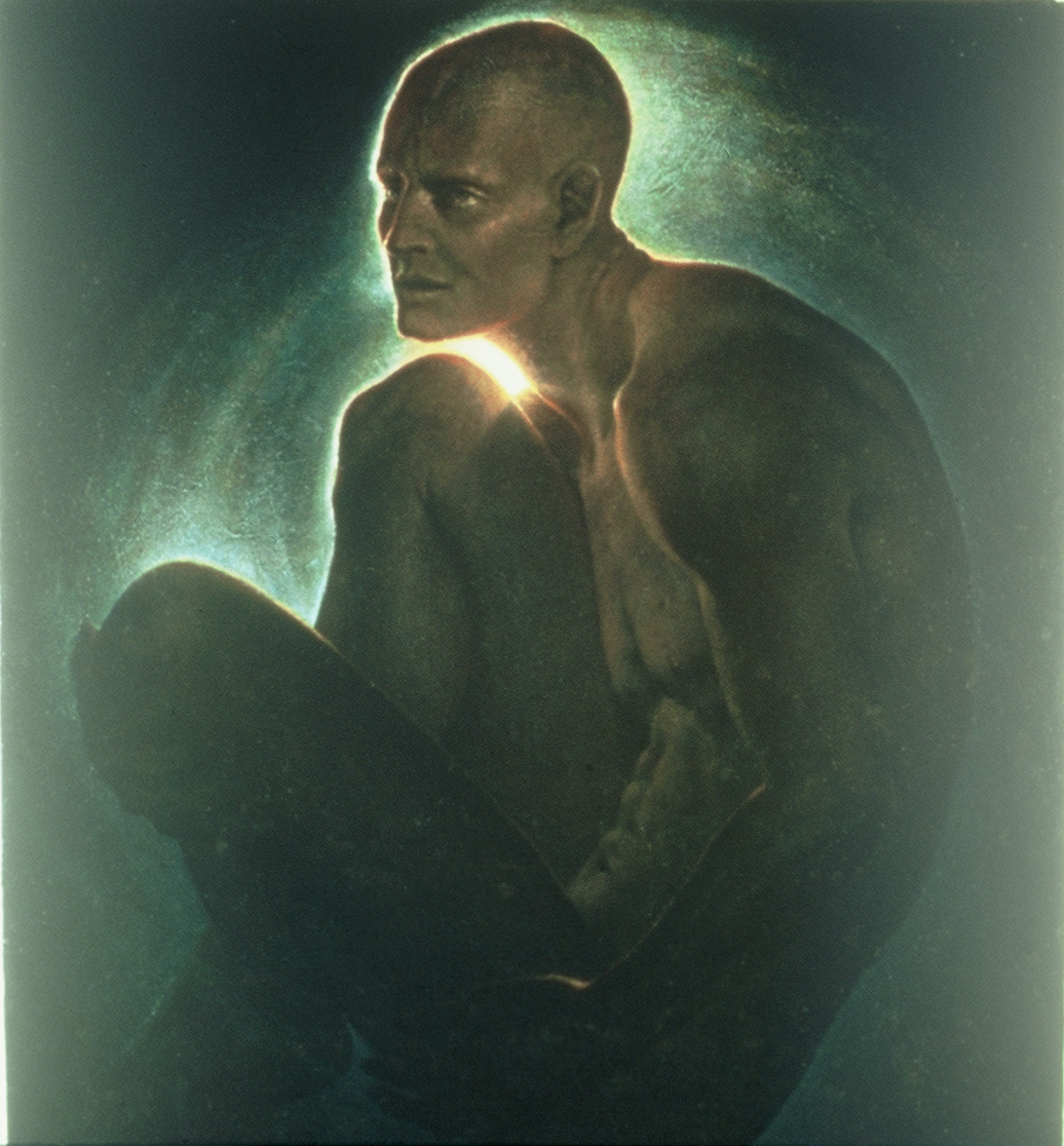
Evolving Man
(1976)

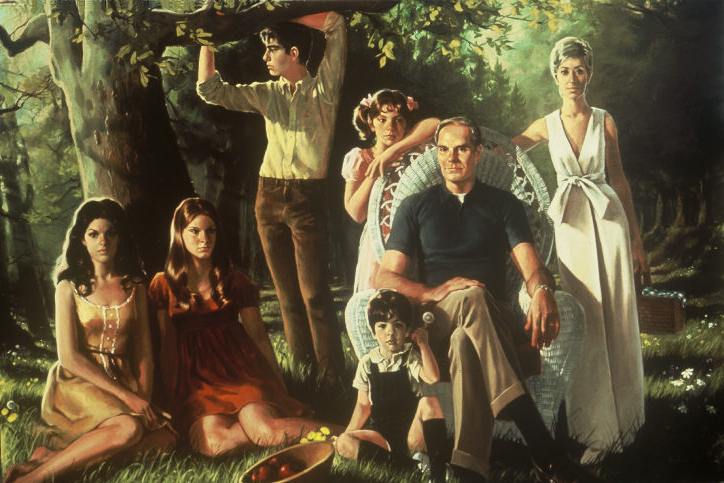
The Julian Mark Family of Stamford Connecticut
(1968)

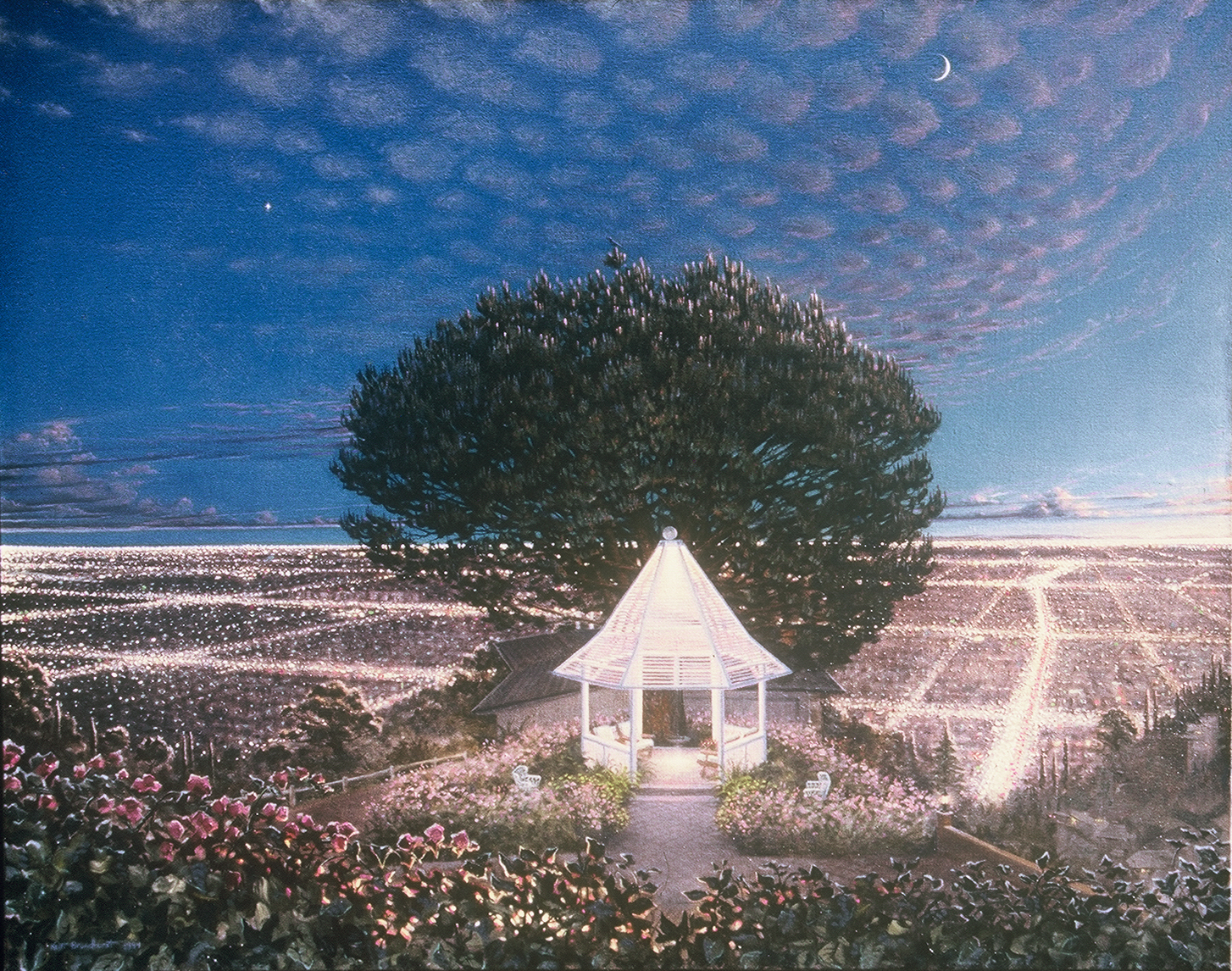
LA POV
(1993)

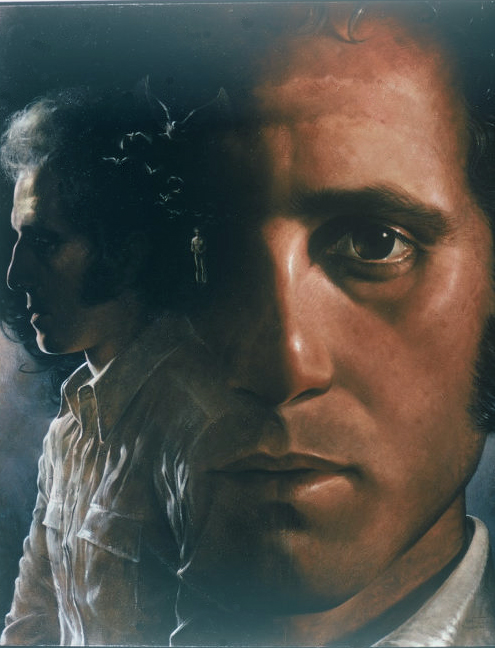
Doctor Joe Santo
(1973)

== Filmography ==
=== Film ===
Kent Broadhurst film credits
Year	Title	Role	Notes
1980	Brubaker	Whitley	
1982	The Verdict	Joseph Alito	
1983	Lovesick	Gay Patient	
1983	Silkwood	Carl	
1985	Silver Bullet	Herb Kincaid	
1996	Seize the Day	Trader #3	
1988	Stars and Bars	Ben Sereno	
1990	A Shock to the System	Executive #1	
1992	Mac	Mr. Tobin	
1993	The Dark Half	Mike Donaldson	
1994	Léon: The Professional	1st Policeman	
1996	A Couch in New York	Tim	
1997	Boys Life 2	Blondie	(segment "Alkali, Iowa")

=== Television ===
Kent Broadhurst television credits
Year	Title	Role	Notes
1985	The Equalizer	Noble	Episode: "The Confirmation Day"
1985	Kane and Abel	Tony Simmons	TV miniseries
1988	War and Remembrance	Capt. George Murray (Enterprise)	TV miniseries
1994	Babylon 5	Major Lewis Krantz	Episode: "Babylon Squared"
1996	Babylon 5	Lewis Krantz	Episode: "War Without End: Part Two"
1993–2002	Law & Order	(various)	4 episodes
2000	Law & Order: Special Victims Unit	Larry Holt	Episode: "Nocturne"
2011	Person of Interest	Heinrich Hauffe	1 episode
