= Preventing Persons from Concealing Their Identity during Riots and Unlawful Assemblies Act =

Act of the Parliament of Canada

Preventing Persons From Concealing Their Identity During Riots And Unlawful Assemblies Act

House of Commons of Canada
- Long title: An Act to amend the Criminal Code (concealment of identity)
- Citation: S.C. 2013, c. 15
- Enacted by: House of Commons of Canada
- Enacted by: Senate of Canada
- Royal assent: June 19, 2013

Legislative history

Initiating chamber: House of Commons of Canada
- Bill title: Bill C-309
- Introduced by: MP Blake Richards
- First reading: October 3, 2011
- Second reading: February 15, 2012
- Third reading: November 31, 2012

Revising chamber: Senate of Canada
- Bill title: Bill C-309
- First reading: November 31, 2012
- Second reading: February 6, 2013
- Third reading: May 23, 2013
- Conference committee bill passed by House of Commons of Canada: May 14, 2012
- Conference committee bill passed by Senate of Canada: April 25, 2013
- Status: In force

The Preventing Persons from Concealing Their Identity during Riots and Unlawful Assemblies Act (French: Loi empêchant les participants à des émeutes ou des attroupements illégaux de dissimuler leur identité, Bill C-309) is a private member's bill, criminalising the actions of protesters who cover their faces during tumultuous demonstrations and introducing a five-year prison sentence for the offence, introduced before the House of Commons of Canada in October 2011 during the 41st Parliament. On February 15, 2012, a 190–97 vote confirmed that the bill would enter a second reading and be sent to the House Standing Committee on Justice and Human Rights.

The proposal was introduced in the context of the 2012 Quebec student protests, and the riots following the 2011 Stanley Cup championship in Vancouver. However, in both circumstances a vast majority present were not wearing masks.

On June 19, 2013, Bill C-309 became law, banning the wearing of masks during a riot or unlawful assembly, carrying a maximum ten-year prison sentence with a conviction of the offence. The Liberal and Conservative parties voted unanimously in favour of the legislation. The Bloc Quebecois, Green Party and NDP cast 96 votes against the bill.

== History and content of the bill ==
At the time of introduction, there was an existing law in Canada entitled "disguise with intent" which already criminalised the wearing of a disguise during a criminal action with a jail sentence of up to 10 years; but supporters of the bill said it had a "higher burden of proof" that the wearer intended to commit a crime. Richards stated that the new bill lowers the burden of proof necessary for a five-year jail sentence and that he is open to reducing the burden of proof necessary for a 10-year conviction as well.

The pre-existing law only criminalised the offence for wearing a disguise if one was also either committing a crime or intending to commit a crime. Richards stated that his bill allows courts to convict Canadians wearing masks at unlawful assemblies or riots, who have been preemptively arrested without evidence of conspiracy or crime.

The bill was meant to grant police the authority to arrest, and courts to convict, anyone who is wearing a mask after there is evidence of rioting, or after police declare a peaceful demonstration to be an "unlawful assembly". Richards has said this will "change the stakes dramatically" in Canadian protests.

== Criticisms of the bill ==
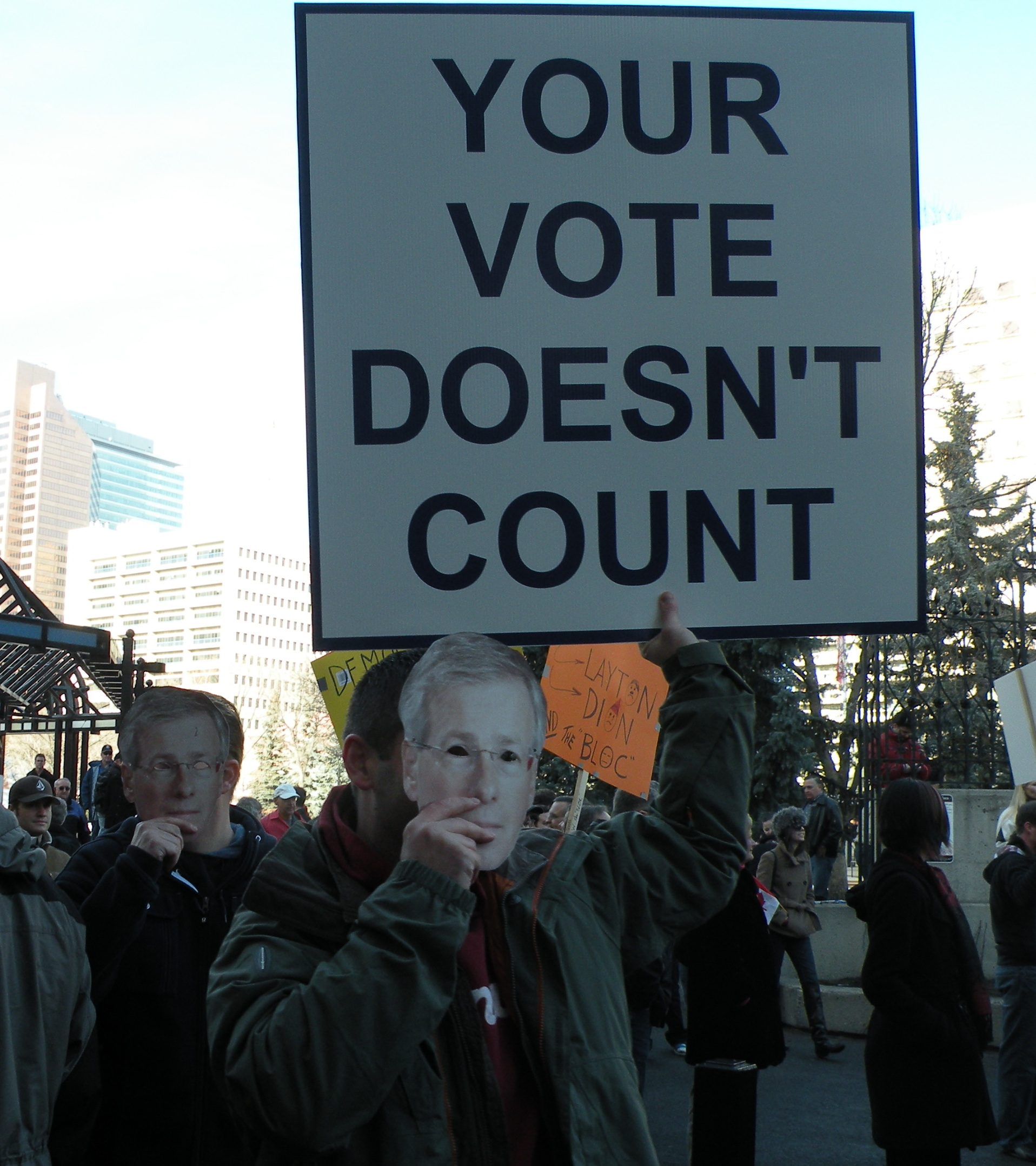
Protesters in Calgary wearing masks of Stephane Dion.

This law simply gives the police even more power to make mistakes with their use of force — and they make too damn many of them already.

— Dave Goulet, Barry's Bay This Week

The Canadian Civil Liberties Association has said that the bill contradicts the Constitution of Canada, and expects that it would not survive a constitutional challenge.

Liberal MP Sean Casey said the bill is meant to foster fear among Canadians about their safety. NDP Member of Parliament Charmaine Borg said that the bill "takes away an individual's right to demonstrate anonymously. An individual is not necessarily going to commit a crime just because he or she is wearing a mask at a riot. It is reasonable to think that the person just wants to remain anonymous and protect his or her identity".

Critics agree that commonly one covers her face to avoid photographs being uploaded to the Internet and causing personal or professional problems. Others have pointed out that faces are often covered with kerchiefs in response to police use of chemical-based weapons such as pepper spray and tear gas.

Activist groups have stated that the bill poses a severe threat to the freedom of assembly. In an era where social media brings people together the technologies the government is involved with like facial recognition software and video surveillance are at an all-time high and are actively being used to identify individuals at protests who may not wish to be identified.

The bill also gives law enforcement more tools to break up peaceful assemblies like the ones organized by the group Anonymous.
