= Richard Nixon mask =

Facial covering depicting the 37th US President

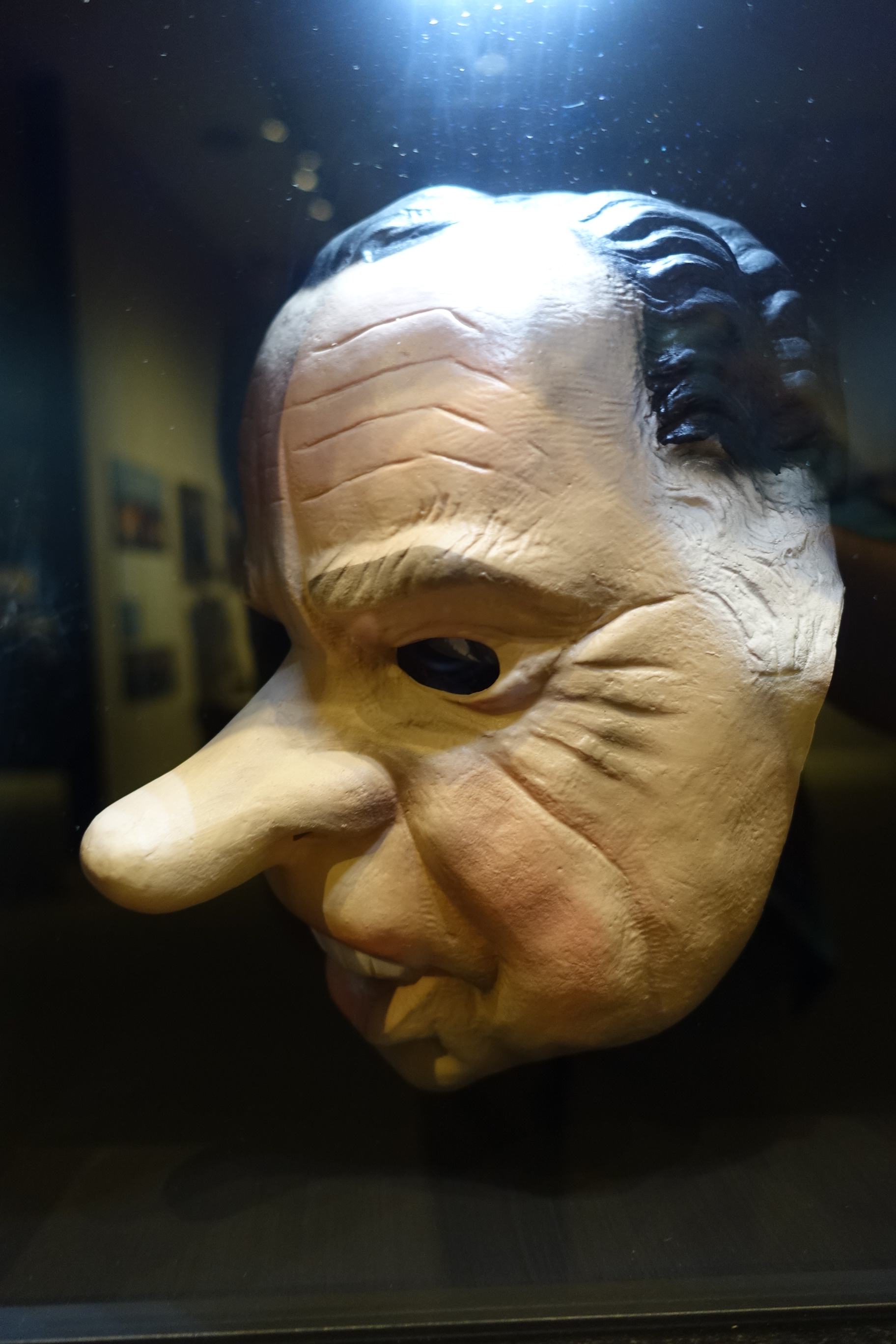
- A vintage Nixon mask on display at the Richard Nixon Presidential Library and Museum.
- Material: Vinyl, latex rubber
- Created: c. 1969–1970s
- Place: France (original manufacture); distributed worldwide
- Present location: Richard Nixon Presidential Library and Museum, Yorba Linda, California (exhibit specimen)

A Richard Nixon mask is a mask with the likeness of Richard Nixon. It was commercially available and quite popular in the waning days of the administration. It is generally made out of vinyl by Cesar Mask (fr), a French company, and is sold worldwide. The most famous Nixon mask was the big nose Nixon comical mask that was made by Cesar in the 1970s. Later, other companies made similar versions made from latex rubber or similar flexible castable compounds.

One of the notable features of most Nixon masks is the classically-caricatured nose. Many of the different versions of the Nixon mask have a wide, grinning smile as well.

Although the masks were widely believed to be only a fad, which would presumably die down as the public attention on Watergate waned and once Nixon left office, the masks managed to outlive their presumed fad status by becoming popular during events such as Halloween and adult masquerade parties. The Nixon mask remains popular today and is worn both for humorous effect and in protest marches and similar "public displays of disaffection". According to Harper's magazine's October 2002 "Harper's Index," Nixon masks were the best-selling political mask for the previous five years for the top U.S. costume wholesaler Morris Costumes. They were the 4th best-selling mask at Halloween Express in 2019.

== In popular culture ==
- Bob Dylan - musician and countercultural figure
- Manic Street Preachers - Welsh band in the video "The Love of Richard Nixon," as well as the cover art for the single.
- John E. Fryer - psychiatrist and gay rights activist who wore a Nixon mask to conceal his appearance during a 1972 APA convention
- During Tom Petty & the Heartbreakers' Southern Accents 1985 tour, when "Don't Come Around Here No More" reached the uptempo climax, actors in Nixon and Reagan masks came out and chased each other all over the stage.
- One of the bank robbers in the 1991 action film Point Break; the other robbers wore masks based on other recent presidents (Johnson, Carter, and Reagan). Many fictional uses of the mask reference this film.
- In South Park, the Book Mobile Driver wears a Nixon mask, before he is revealed by Officer Barbrady, in Chickenlover episode (1998)
- In Family Guy, Cleveland Brown is shown wearing one in "The Tan Aquatic with Steve Zissou" episode (2007).
- In the 2021 Netflix action film Army of Thieves the character Brad Cage is shown wearing a Nixon mask during the second robbery.
- The video games Payday: The Heist and Payday 2 have the Nixon mask as an option for character customization.
- In That '70s Show, Eric Forman is shown nude wearing only the mask during a Ford speech in the episode "Streaking".
- In season 3, episode 2 of I Think You Should Leave with Tim Robinson, the "Darmine Doggy Door" sketch features a pig wearing a Richard Nixon mask.
- In season 1, episode 5 of Will & Grace one of Harlin's children is seen wearing a Richard Nixon mask as a Halloween Costume. It is also mentioned in the Season 2, episode 7, "Homo for the Holidays", when it is revealed that Jack's biological father was actually an anonymous man in a Nixon mask.
