= Rod McKie =

British cartoonist (died 2021)

- Born: 1957 or 1958 U.K.
- Died: 26 March 2021 (aged 63) Edinburgh, Scotland
- Area: Cartoonist
- Notable works: Skid Kidd
- Spouse: Lis

One of Rod McKie's cartoons

Roderick McKie (1957/1958 – 26 March 2021) was a British cartoonist. He began drawing gag cartoons for Britain's national press whilst still at school.

In the early 1980s, he became one of Punch magazine's youngest cartoonists. He created, drew and wrote, the comic character Skid Kidd for IPC's Buster comic. McKie made it clear from the start that he wanted the character, initially an ongoing serial rather than a self-contained weekly story, to look like "key" scenes from an animation storyboard rather than a conventional comic page. The character and the backgrounds were drawn flat, with a rigid, inflexible nib, in order that the eye of the reader should not be distracted by thick and thin lines.

His work appeared in publications as diverse as The Wall Street Journal, the Harvard Business Review, Reader's Digest (USA), Ellery Queen's Mystery Magazine, Prospect (UK), The Phoenix, and a range of other titles. He had a number of cartoons published in National Lampoon's Favorite Cartoons of the 21st Century.

As of 2012, McKie had been working on three graphic novels.

McKie died in Edinburgh on 26 March 2021 following a brain hemorrhage at age 63. He left behind his wife Lis and three grown children.

== In popular culture ==
McKie was portrayed, as himself, in Albion #3 (WildStorm, Dec. 2005), the six-issue limited series that aimed to revive classic IPC-owned British comics characters, all of whom appeared in comics published by Odhams Press and later IPC Media during the 1960s and early 1970s, such as Smash!, Valiant, and Lion. (Albion was plotted by Alan Moore, written by his daughter Leah Moore and her husband John Reppion, with art by Shane Oakley and George Freeman.)

In the comic, the fictional McKie claims to have saved a number of pages of original comic art — including his own and Tom Paterson's, from IPC headquarters at King's Reach Tower before they were burned for being a fire hazard. He attempted to salvage pages by Pete Dredge, Stanley McMurtry, and Leo Baxendale, but was prevented from doing so because he didn't have permission. The quote appeared to be from a real source, as one of McKie's daughters confirmed that the real McKie had indeed saved some pages from IPC at some point in the 1980s.
