= Spivs (film) =

- UK theatrical release poster
- Directed by: Colin Teague
- Written by: Mike Loveday; Colin Teague; Gary Young
- Produced by: Hamish Skeggs
- Starring: Ken Stott; Nick Moran; Kate Ashfield; Dominic Monaghan; Jack Dee
- Cinematography: Haris Zambarloukos
- Edited by: Eddie Hamilton
- Music by: David Julyan
- Distributed by: Verve Pictures
- Release date: 24 September 2004
- Running time: 95 minutes
- Country: United Kingdom
- Languages: English; Albanian

Spivs is a 2004 British crime film directed by Colin Teague, who also co-wrote the screenplay along with screenwriters Gary Young, and Mike Loveday. It is the second of three undertakings by Teague and Young, the others being Shooters and The Last Drop, respectively. Incidentally, director Glenn Durfort, who worked with Teague on Shooters, appears briefly in all three of these films.

== Plot summary ==
Jack, Steve and Goat are East End London "spivs" (British slang for a black marketeer) who spend their days wheeling and dealing whenever and wherever they can. But not until they are landed with the juicy payoff they have been waiting for, involving a shady character who calls himself Villa, do they realize the trouble they have got into. After opening a truck door they discover they were not smuggling merchandise, rather they were smuggling people. The people run out of the cargo area. Jack is mad at Steve for not checking. Then suddenly they discover two small Albanian children a girl and a boy. Now they are in even more trouble.

== Cast ==
Actor	Role
Kate Ashfield	Jenny
Linda Bassett	Auntie Vee
Chooi Beh	Japanese Man
Elizabeth Berrington	Nigel's Secretary
Cavan Clerkin	Bob
Shane Davey	Ice Skater
Jack Dee	Nigel
Louis Dempsey	Uncle Frank
Glenn Durfort	Glenn
Neil Edmond	Observant Waiter
Stephen Evans	Park Attendant
Julia Hargesheimer	Teenage Safe House Girl
Tamer Hassan	Villa
Paul Kaye	O’Brien
Steven Lawson	Romanian Slave
Derek Lea	Villa's Associate
Dominic Monaghan	Goat
Nick Moran	Steve
Rita Ora	Rosanna
T. J. Ramini	Pavel
Sonny Rooney	Young Jack
Sarah Row	Slaone Woman
Roshan Seth	Omar
Madhav Sharma	Mr. Singh
Ken Stott	Jack
Colin Teague	Young Associate
Nadia Ward	Sonia
Christos Zenonos	Anton
