= The Last Drop =

- Directed by: Colin Teague
- Written by: Colin Teague; Gary Young
- Produced by: Hamish Skeggs; Andrei Boncea
- Starring: Billy Zane; Michael Madsen; Karel Roden; Tommy Flanagan
- Cinematography: Maxime Alexandre
- Edited by: Michael Ellis
- Music by: David Julyan
- Production companies: Carnaby International; Media Pro Pictures
- Distributed by: Sony Pictures Home Entertainment (UK)
- Release date: 8 March 2006 (UK)
- Running time: 103 minutes
- Countries: United Kingdom; Romania
- Language: English

The Last Drop is a 2006 British-Romanian adventure war film by Colin Teague that was released direct to video. Teague collaborated with Gary Young, with whom he had previously worked with on British crime drama films Shooters and Spivs.

== Plot summary ==
The film is set during World War II, amidst Operation Market Garden. Captain Edward Banks (Andrew Howard) and Corporal Powell (Neil Newbon), both SOE undercover British Intelligence officers, are given command of a small unit dubbed "Matchbox".

The objective of Matchbox is to retrieve Dutch gold and art treasures plundered by the Nazis, concealed within an underground bunker rigged with traps. Matchbox's mission is disrupted as they are downed before reaching their drop zone after facing hostile fire from German forces, which results in casualties. The surviving members include Powell, Private Alan Ives (Nick Moran), Flight Lieutenant Robert Oates (Billy Zane), Private David Wellings (Rafe Spall), and Sergeant Bill McMillan (Sean Pertwee). Oates, as the senior member, is appointed to lead the group, as they do not know Powell and Banks are Intelligence Agents.

Renegade German forces led by Lieutenant Jergen Voller (Alexander Skarsgård) who is Kessler's brother, alongside Corporal Dieter Max (David Ginola) and Sergeant Hans Beck (Karel Roden), also attempt to retrieve the Dutch gold and art treasures. Voller captures Gustav Hansfeldt (Steve Speirs), right hand man of SS Major Kessler (Laurence Fox). Gustav escorts them to the bunker in Arnhem where the treasure is stored.

Dutch resistance fighters Benitta (Lucy Gaskell) and Saskia (Coral Beed) locate the stolen loot beneath their farm and upon finding that it is about to transported to Berlin by Kessler, inform the British Intelligence. Benitta meets Powell at a nearby church, who then discloses his affiliation with British Intelligence to Matchbox.

Oates leads his troops to Arnhem, while Baker and Powell head to the bunker. Baker diffuses booby traps along the way and they soon secure the loot. Realising Kessler is coming, the group booby traps the bunker with explosives. Powell plans to steal a sea plane and divert it to Britain with the loot on board.

Following a shoot out between the two forces in which Baker is shot, Powell traps Kessler inside the bunker but is shot before boarding the plane. Baker wakes up and detonates the bombs, killing Kessler. The rest of the British crew make it out, and Voller and Beck sneak aboard posing as Americans. The loot was delivered to the British Government and displayed in a museum. Beck and Voller steal the loot from the museum and head to Switzerland. A few years later, the British survivors return to Arnhem.

== Cast ==
- Laurence Fox as SS Major Klaus Kessler, a Nazi SS officer tasked with safeguarding the loot
- Louis Dempsey as Snyder
- Lucy Gaskell as Benitta, member of the Dutch resistance
- Coral Beed as Saskia, member of the Dutch resistance
- Andrew Howard as Captain Edward Banks
- Jack Dee as Warren
- Neil Newbon as Corporal Rhys Powell, an undercover SOE agent who has been tasked by British Intelligence as Matchbox's team lead
- Nick Moran as Private Alan Ives, a petty thief and surviving member of Matchbox
- Rafe Spall as Private David Wellings, A naïve medical orderly andsurviving member of Matchbox
- Tommy Flanagan as Private Dennis Baker, a drunken, somewhat psychotic bomb disposal expert and one of the few surviving members of Matchbox
- Sean Pertwee as Sergeant Bill McMillan, a veteran and surviving member of Matchbox
- Billy Zane as Flight Lieutenant Robert Oates, a RCAF pilot and surviving member of Matchbox
- Neil Jackson, as Flight Lieutenant Simkins
- Steve Speirs as Gustav Hansfeldt, right hand man of Kessler
- Agathe De La Boulaye as Katrina, Voller's mistress
- David Ginola as Corporal Dieter Max
- Karel Roden as Sergeant Hans Beck, a renegade German soldier
- Alexander Skarsgård as Lieutenant Jergen Voller, a renegade German soldier and Kessler's brother
- Michael Madsen as Lieutenant Colonel James T. Colt, a commander in the 101st Airborne Division
- Todd Spangler as Lieutenant Jack Shannon
- Dave Evans as Private Meyer
- Justin Thompson as Steiner
- Gheorge Debre as Mayer
- Iaona Popescu-Galgotiu as Mayer's Wife
- Diarmid Scrimshaw as Museum Guide
- Aoife Madden as Janet
