= Maelstrom International Fantastic Film Festival =

Coordinates: 47°37′26.39″N 122°21′1.72″W

Maelstrom International Fantastic Film Festival(MIFFF)
- MIFFF Logo
- Status: Discontinued
- Genre: action/fantasy/horror/science fiction
- Venue: SIFF Cinema at McCaw Hall
- Location: Seattle, Washington
- Country: USA
- Inaugurated: 2009
- Organizer: MIFFF
- Filing status: Non-profit
- Website: www.mifff.org

The Maelstrom International Fantastic Film Festival (MIFFF) was a three day international genre film festival held annually in Seattle, Washington. MIFFF was the premiere Pacific Northwest event devoted to action, animation, fantasy, horror and science fiction cinema from around the globe. The Seattle International Film Festival (SIFF) Cinema at McCaw Hall hosted MIFFF which resided on the campus of Seattle Center.

== Overview ==
Official posters outside the SIFF Cinema at McCaw Hall leading to the 2009 event.

The "Founding Fathers" of MIFFF are Eric Morgret, Isaac Alexander, Rick Tillman, Gabe de los Angeles & Dan Doody. The festival was first conceived at a gathering in June 2008, which led to the first event taking place in September 2009. The event was created to offer exposure to films that traditionally are overlooked by the mainstream festival circuit from genres including action, animation, fantasy, horror, and science fiction. The vision drew inspiration from other genre film festivals around the globe such as Fantasia Festival in Montreal, Fantastic Fest in Austin, and the first genre film festival, the Sitges Film Festival in Catalonia. MIFFF was registered shortly thereafter as a Washington State non-profit and acts as the parent organization of the Maelstrom International Fantastic Film Festival. The festival featured a diverse selection of cult genre cinema from around the globe – with the possibility of artists presenting the works themselves.

== Current and upcoming festivals ==
=== 2011 ===
The third annual MIFFF was held September 16–18, 2011 at the SIFF Cinema at McCaw Hall in Seattle, Washington. The festival showcased five feature films and 49 short films from around the world.

==== Feature films presented ====
- Absentia
- Boy Wonder
- The Melancholy Fantastic
- Midnight Son
- The Selling

==== Short films presented ====
- A Penny Earned
- Air
- Alley Dog
- Alone
- Antedon
- Arthur
- The Astronaut on the Roof
- Blind Luck
- Brutal Relax
- Call of Nature
- Cankered & Cursed
- Cosas Feas (Nasty Stuff)
- Dead Friends
- La Doncella Dormida (The Sleeping Maiden)
- Doppelganger
- Earthship
- Employé du Mois (Employee of the Month)
- Entanglement
- Escape Of The Gingerbread Man
- Fábrica de Muñecas (Dolls Factory)
- Facing Rupert
- Fitness Class Zombie
- The Girl and the Fox
- High Fashion
- Idle Worship
- Juan Con Miedo (Fearful John)
- Junk
- Junk Bonds: The Return of Junkbucket (trailer)
- Lonely
- Loom
- Mongrel's Creed
- Nullarbor
- Paths of Hate
- Payload
- Pharos
- Pinball
- Rantdog's Top Ten Zombies Ever
- R.O.A.C.H.
- Rosa
- Sharfik
- O Solitário Ataque de Vorgon (Vorgon's Lonesome Raid)
- Status
- Suffer
- Switch
- Toy House
- La Tragedia del Hombre Hueco (The Hollow Man's Tragedy)
- Vicenta
- The Waking
- The Year of the Child

==== Awards ====
- Best Feature (Audience Award): Boy Wonder
- Best Feature (Jury Award): Absentia
- Best Animation Short (Audience & Jury Award): Nullarbor
- Best Fantasy Short (Audience Award): Employe du Mois
- Best Fantasy Short (Jury Award): Arthur
- Best Horror Short (Audience & Jury Award): Brutal Relax
- Best Sci-Fi Short (Audience Award): Mongrel's Creed
- Best Sci-Fi Short (Jury Award): Status

== Past festivals ==
=== 2010 ===
The second annual MIFFF was held September 17–19, 2010 at the SIFF Cinema at McCaw Hall in Seattle, Washington. The festival showcased 4 feature films and 41 short films from around the world.

==== Feature films presented ====
- Blood River
- Mørke Sjeler (Dark Souls)
- The Presence
- Srpski Film (A Serbian Film)

==== Short films presented ====
- A Complex Villainelle
- The Abaddon File
- Alice Jacobs Is Dead
- Babylon 2084
- Billy Baxter and the Mystery of Dr. Amazo
- Clemency
- Cockpit: The Rule of Engagement
- ConLang
- The Cow Who Wanted to Be a Hamburger
- DemiUrge Emesis
- Dracula's Daughter vs The Space Brains
- Ducked and Covered: A Survival Guide to the Post Apocalypse
- Elder Sign
- The Familiar
- Father and Sister
- Flat Love
- Flowers for Norma
- The Hatter's Apprentice
- The Hollow Girl
- Journey Quest
- Kidnap
- The Lift
- Love Does Grow on Trees
- The Macabre World of Lavender Williams
- Manual Práctico del Amigo Imaginario(A Practical Guide for Imaginary Friends (abridged))
- The Necronomicon
- No Escape
- Noirville
- One Small Step
- Porque Hay Costas Que Nunca Se Olvidan (Because There Are Things We Never Forget)
- Red Revenge
- Rise of the Living Corpse
- Scottish Ninjas
- Slap Back Jack: High Five Master
- ST: Phoenix
- Street Angel
- SuperBattle (Episode 1)
- The 3rd Letter
- Thy Kill Be Done
- Toothnapped
- Two Men, Two Cows, Two Guns

==== Awards ====
- Best Feature: The Presence
- Best Action Short: Street Angel
- Best Animation Short: A Complex Villainelle
- Best Fantasy Short: Manual Practico del Amigo Imaginario (abreviado)
- Best Horror Short: The Familiar
- Best Sci-Fi Short: Babylon 2084

=== 2009 ===
The first MIFFF was held September 18–20, 2009 at the SIFF Cinema at McCaw Hall in Seattle, Washington. The festival showcased 6 feature films and 33 short films from around the world.

==== Feature films presented ====
- The Ends Of The Earth
- Pig Hunt
- The Revenant
- Strigoi - (West Coast Premier)
- TimeTravel_0
- Until The Light Takes Us

==== Short films presented ====
- aQua ad lavandum - in brevi
- The Auburn Hills Breakdown
- Badewanne zum Glück (Bathtub To Happiness)
- Cheerbleeders
- Dead Bones
- Death In Charge
- The Delivery
- Egg Robot Momo
- Enigma
- Enter the Sandbox
- Fantastic Magnifico
- Firemount
- Foet
- La Glacière Rouge(The Red Icebox)
- Greenspoke
- Gul(Flower)
- Hart
- The Horribly Slow Murderer with the Extremely Inefficient Weapon
- The Kirkie
- Lazarus Taxon
- Mr. Gun
- Milbe(Mite)
- Die Schneider Krankheit(The Schneider Disease)
- Skylight
- Sunday
- Thirsty
- The Tree Man
- Tropezones
- The Ugly File
- The Urge
- Virtual Dating
- Der Weltenbauer(The Builder Of Worlds)
- X-Mess Detritus

==== Awards ====
- Best Feature: Strigoi
- Best Sci-Fi Short: Kirkie
- Best Horror Short: Death in Charge
- Best Fantasy Short: Hart
- Best Animation Short: Enter the Sandbox

== Official Festival Posters ==
Official 2009 poster

Official 2010 poster

Official 2011 poster

== See also ==
- List of fantastic and horror film festivals
