= David Hitchcock =

David Hitchcock may refer to:

- David Hitchcock (comics), English comics writer and artist
- D. Howard Hitchcock (1861–1943), American/Hawaiian painter
- Dave Hitchcock, former record producer
