= David Julyan =

British composer

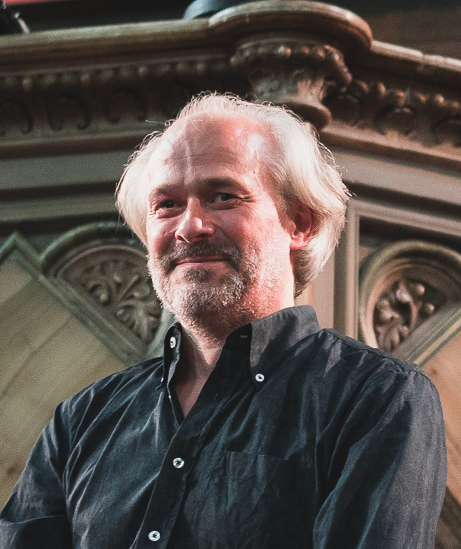
- Julyan in 2017
- Born: Cheltenham, Gloucestershire, England
- Citizenship: British
- Occupations: Musician, score composer
- Years active: 1996–present

David Julyan is an English musician and score composer. He is best known for composing the scores for director Christopher Nolan's early films.

== Early life ==
David Julyan was born in 1967 in Cheltenham, England.

== Other projects ==
In 2006, he scored the horror movie The Descent and a UK feature, Outlaw. Julyan has also been invited to sit on film music discussion panels at various film festivals, including the BMI Music & Film Panel at the 2004 and 2006 Sundance Film Festivals and the 2002 Flanders International Film Festival Ghent panel on "How to Get Started in Film Music". An interview with him has been included in the book Moving Music.

== Filmography ==
Year	Title	Director	Notes
1996	Larceny	Christopher Nolan	Short film
1997	Doodlebug	Christopher Nolan	Short film
1998	Following	Christopher Nolan	Feature film debut The music budget for the film was around $8 for a blank digital audio tape.
2000	Memento	Christopher Nolan	
2001	The Secret Rulers of the World	Jon Ronson	TV series documentary Miniseries
2002	Insomnia	Christopher Nolan	
2002	Happy Here and Now	Michael Almereyda	
2004	Spivs	Colin Teague	
2004	Inside I'm Dancing	Damien O'Donnell	Inside I'm Dancing is an oddity among Julyan's scores in that it includes no synthesizers.
2005	Dungeons & Dragons: Wrath of the Dragon God	Gerry Lively	
2005	Matrioshki	Marc Punt; Guy Goossens	TV miniseries
2005	The Descent	Neil Marshall	The score includes a 70 piece orchestra and 16 piece female choir.
2006	The Last Drop	Colin Teague	
2006	The Prestige	Christopher Nolan	
2006	Simon Schama's Power of Art	David Belton	Documentary series One episode (he composed the score for the episode on Van Gogh)
2007	Outlaw	Nick Love	
2007	WΔZ	Tom Shankland	
2008	Eden Lake	James Watkins	
2008	The Daisy Chain	Aisling Walsh	
2009	The Descent Part 2	Jon Harris	
2009	Heartless	Philip Ridley	
2011	The Cabin in the Woods	Drew Goddard	
2012	Playhouse Presents	Amanda Boyle	One episode
2012	Blackout	Tom Green	TV miniseries
2013	The Silent War	David Belton	Documentary miniseries One episode
2015	Hidden	The Duffer Brothers	
2015	Second Origin	Bigas Luna	
2016	Bachelor Games	Edward McGown	
2016	Broken Vows	Bram Coppens	
2017	The Crucifixion	Xavier Gens	
