= Hellebore (magazine) =

British folk horror magazine

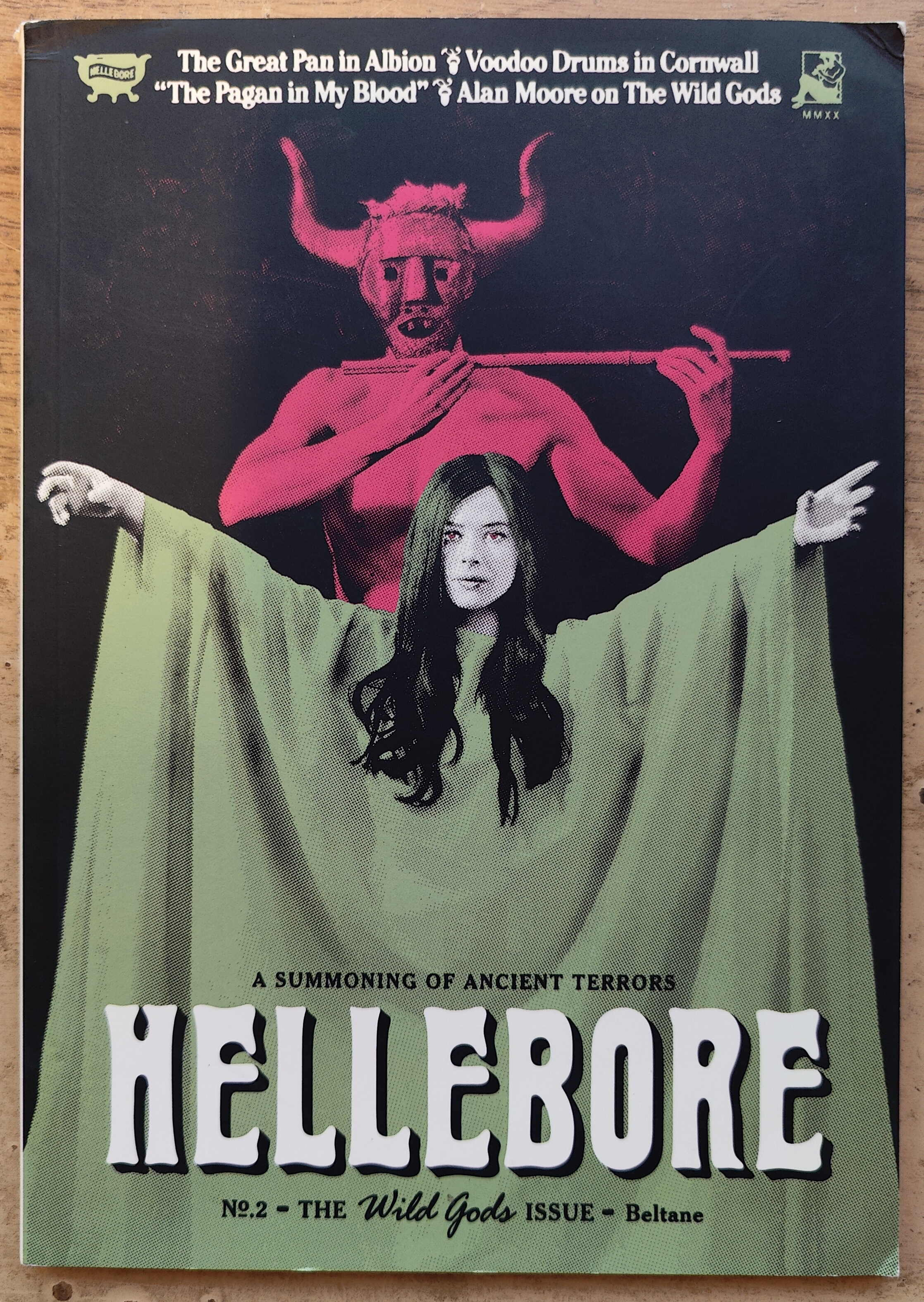
- Issue 2 cover
- Editor: Maria J. Pérez
- Country: United Kingdom
- Website: helleborebooks.com

Hellebore is a small press magazine devoted to British folk horror and the occult. It was a World Fantasy Awards finalist in 2022.

== Overview ==
Hellebore was founded in 2019 by Maria J. Pérez Cuervo. It started as a folk horror, non-fiction magazine. Its first issue, "The Sacrifice Issue", was published in October 2019, edited by Cuervo, with art direction by Nathaniel Hébert and a cover image by Paul Watson. Cuervo explained she “wanted the aesthetics to evoke (...) the late 60s and 70s, grabbing inspiration from Czech film posters, with a touch of psychedelia, and an old-school fanzine finish.” The name was taken from the hellebore plant, known to alter the physical perceptions of those who consume it and thought to be one of the ingredients of the witches’ flying ointment.

The second issue, "The Wild Gods Issue", was released in May 2020, establishing the pattern of publication of the magazine: two issues a year, in May and October, to coincide with the pagan festivals of Beltane and Samhain. Articles cover film history, literature, folklore, history, and archaeology.

In December 2021, Hellebore published The Hellebore Guide to Occult Britain and Northern Ireland, a travel guide including destinations linked to witchcraft, magic, and megaliths, as well as film, TV, and literary locations. Andy Paciorek of Folk Horror Revival, reviewing the book for Fortean Times, described it as “a gazetteer of British ritual, weird-lore and magical creativity”.

The segment 'Stone Mothers' in Ric Rawling's folk horror film anthology Rewilding (2023) was inspired by an article in Hellebore's The Wild Gods Issue.

== Cultural context ==
Hellebore is a print-only magazine. Cuervo explained she "wanted to make a beautiful object" at a time when "print feels like a small luxury" due to our heavy consumption of digital information. American horror novelist Grady Hendrix said Hellebore had "almost single-handedly" made him "fall in love with magazines again".

Andy Paciorek notes that Hellebore "blossomed in the revival of attention to occulture and folklore". French journalist Laurent Courau suggests Hellebore's success is part of an occult revival happening against a backdrop of economic, ecological, and social crisis.

Dazed includes Hellebore among "a wave of new media" offering a way into a neo-pagan movement that imagines "alternate futures with an eye on the Old Ways". For Green Lung's vocalist Tom Templar, Hellebore is part of the new wave of zines that "have reintroduced readers to the weirdness of the British landscape and its history, from folk horror to alternative heritage sites to archaic rural traditions".

Cuervo explained she wanted Hellebore to be political because folklore is often weaponised by the far right. Fiddler’s Green publisher, Clint Marsh, pointed out that Hellebore addresses the “conservative motif” present in many folk horror stories, taking an anti-fascist stance from its first issue.

== Contributors ==
Past contributors have included writers John Reppion, Verity Holloway, Roger Clarke, David Southwell, and academics Amara Thornton, Catherine Spooner, A.D. Manns, Francis Young, and Katy Soar. It has also featured interviews with Ronald Hutton, Alan Moore, and the work of artists and photographers Ellen Rogers, Nona Limmen, and Isa Bancewicz.

== Awards ==
Hellebore was a World Fantasy Awards finalist in 2022.
