= J. H. Williams III =

American comics artist and penciller (born 1965)

- Born: James H. Williams III; 1965 (age 60–61)
- Areas: Writer, penciller, inker, colorist
- Notable works: Batwoman; Chase; Desolation Jones; Detective Comics; Promethea; The Sandman: Overture
- Awards: Eisner Award, 2001, 2010; Harvey Award, 2006; Inkwell Award for The All-in-One Award, 2012

James H. Williams III (born 1965) is an American comics artist and penciller. He is known for his work on titles such as Chase, Promethea, Desolation Jones, Batwoman, and The Sandman: Overture.

== Career ==
Williams' early work includes penciling the four-issue miniseries, Deathwish (1994–1995) from Milestone Media. Deathwish was written by Maddie Blaustein and inked by Jimmy Palmiotti. He was one of the artists on the Shade limited series which spun off from the Starman series. Williams gained prominence as the artist on the short-lived (ten issues, 1997–1998) Chase title from DC Comics, where he worked with writer Dan Curtis Johnson. The character had been introduced earlier in Batman #550 (Jan. 1998).

Williams collaborated with inker Mick Gray on two DC Elseworlds graphic novels, Justice Riders, written by Chuck Dixon, and Son of Superman, written by Howard Chaykin and David Tischman. Williams' next major work was for WildStorm's America's Best Comics with writer Alan Moore on Promethea (32 issues, 1999–2005).

In mid–2005, Williams and writer Warren Ellis launched the Desolation Jones series, and Williams illustrated the two "bookend" issues of Grant Morrison's Seven Soldiers project. In 2007, he worked with Morrison on another project, a three-part story in Batman #667–669. Williams drew Jonah Hex #35 and has stated an interest in doing more, saying "I certainly want to do more issues myself or even a graphic novel if the opportunity and schedule presented itself." Williams became the regular artist on Detective Comics with writer Greg Rucka in June 2009, with the title focusing on Rucka's Batwoman character due to the absence of Batman in the aftermath of "Batman R.I.P." and Final Crisis. Williams returned as artist and co-writer of the new Batwoman series, accompanied by co-author W. Haden Blackman. Batwoman received a GLAAD Media Award in the category of "Outstanding Comic Book" at the 23rd GLAAD Media Awards in June 2012.

In July 2012, DC announced that Williams would be the artist for Neil Gaiman's Sandman prequel series, The Sandman: Overture, to be released October 30, 2013. That same month, as part of San Diego Comic-Con, Williams was one of six artists who, along with DC co-publishers Jim Lee and Dan DiDio, participated in the production of "Heroic Proportions", an episode of the Syfy reality television competition series Face Off, in which special effects artists were tasked to create a new superhero, with Williams and the other DC artists on hand to help them develop their ideas. The winning entry's character, Infernal Core by Anthony Kosar, was featured in Justice League Dark #16 (March 2013), which was published January 30, 2013. The episode premiered on January 22, 2013, as the second episode of the fourth season.

Both Williams and Blackman resigned from the Batwoman title in September 2013 due to differences with DC's editorial decisions.

In September 2020, DC Comics announced that Williams would be among the creators of a revived Batman: Black and White anthology series to debut on December 8, 2020. He also provided the variant cover.

In August 2021 Image Comics released Echolands, a series created by Williams and Blackman. It ran for six issues up to February 2022.

In October 2024 Image Comics published Williams's Dracula: A Storybook Portfolio, an illustrated adaptation of Bram Stoker's novel.

== Bibliography ==
=== Interior work ===
- Hero Alliance Quarterly #2–3 (with Robert M. Ingersoll, Innovation, 1991–1992)
- Demonic Toys #1–4 (with Doug Campbell, Eternity, 1992)
- The Twilight Zone #4 (with Chuck Dixon, NOW, 1992)
- Blood Syndicate #9, 15 (with Ivan Velez Jr., Milestone, 1993–1994)
- Empires of Night #1 (with Michael House, Rebel Studios, 1993)
- Showcase '93 #12: "The Colour of Courage" (with Brian Augustyn, DC Comics, 1993)
- Raw Media Mags #4: "Empires of Night: Epilogue-Prologue" (with Michael House, Rebel Studios, 1994)
- Deathwish #1–4 (with Maddie Blaustein, Milestone, 1994)
- Guy Gardner: Warrior #26, 32 (with Beau Smith, DC Comics, 1994)
- Judge Dredd #5–10, 12 (with Andrew Helfer, Michael Avon Oeming and Dev Madan, DC Comics, 1994–1995)
- Wolverine Annual '95: "Lair of the N'Garai" (with Larry Hama, Marvel, 1995)
- Underworld Unleashed: Abyss — Hell's Sentinel (with Scott Peterson, one-shot, DC Comics, 1995)
- Batman (DC Comics, 1996–2007):
  - "Constant Whitewater" (with Doug Moench, in #526, 1996)
  - "The Screams of the Green Dragon" (with Doug Moench, in Annual #21, 1997)
  - "Chasing Clay" (with Doug Moench and Kelley Jones, in #550, 1998)
  - "Suit of Evil Souls" (with Doug Moench and Kelley Jones, in #551, 1998)
  - "The Island of Mister Mayhew" (with Grant Morrison, in #667–669, 2007)
- Batman Black and White #1: "Weight" (DC Comics, 2020
- Batman: Legends of the Dark Knight (DC Comics, 1996–2005):
  - "Conspiracy" (with Doug Moench, in #86–88, 1996)
  - "Snow" (with Dan Curtis Johnson and Seth Fisher, in #192–196, 2005)
- Green Lantern #80: "Light in Darkness" (with Ron Marz, DC Comics, 1996)
- The Flash Annual #9: "Silent Running" (with Peter J. Tomasi, DC Comics, 1996)
- The Big Book of the Unexplained: "The Valentich Vanishing" (with Doug Moench, Paradox Press, 1997)
- Justice Riders (with Chuck Dixon, one-shot, DC Comics, 1997)
- Starman #26, Annual #1 (with James Robinson, DC Comics, 1997)
- The Shade #2: "Rupert and Marguerite: 1865 & 1931" (with James Robinson, DC Comics, 1997)
- Green Lantern (with James Robinson, one-shot, Tangent, 1997)
- Chase #1–9, 1 000 000 (with Dan Curtis Johnson, DC Comics, 1997–1998)
- Uncanny X-Men #352: "In Sin Air" (with Steven T. Seagle and various artists, Marvel, 1998)
- The Creeper #9: "Mental Block" (with Dan Abnett and Andy Lanning, DC Comics, 1998)
- Chronos #1 000 000 (with John Francis Moore, DC Comics, 1998)
- Tales of the Green Lantern (with James Robinson, one-shot, Tangent, 1998)
- X-Man #46–47 (with Terry Kavanagh, Marvel, 1998–1999)
- Son of Superman (with Howard Chaykin and David Tischman, graphic novel, DC Comics, 1999)
- Promethea #1–32 (with Alan Moore, America's Best Comics, 1999–2005)
- JLA #48: "Truth is Stranger" (with Mark Waid and Bryan Hitch, DC Comics, 2000)
- Métal Hurlant #3: "Eucharist Sun" (with Alejandro Jodorowsky and Kirk Anderson, Les Humanoïdes Associés, 2002)
- Hellboy: Weird Tales #5: "Love is Scarier than Monsters" (with W. Haden Blackman, Dark Horse, 2003)
- DC Comics Presents: Mystery in Space #1: "Crisis on Two Worlds" (with Elliot S! Maggin, DC Comics, 2004)
- Wild Girl #1–6 (with Leah Moore, John Mark Reppion and Shawn McManus, Wildstorm, 2005)
- Seven Soldiers of Victory #0 and 1 (with Grant Morrison, DC Comics, 2005–2006)
- Desolation Jones #1–6 (with Warren Ellis, Wildstorm, 2005–2006)
- Detective Comics (DC Comics, 2006–2010):
  - "The Beautiful People" (with Paul Dini, in #821, 2006)
  - "Elegy" (with Greg Rucka, in #854–857, 2009)
  - "Go" (with Greg Rucka, in #858–860, 2009–2010)
- Justice League of America #0 (with Brad Meltzer, DC Comics, 2007)
- Jonah Hex #35: "A Crude Offer" (with Justin Gray and Jimmy Palmiotti, DC Comics, 2008)
- Milestone Forever #1: "Hardware" (with Dwayne McDuffie, Milestone, 2010)
- DC Universe: Legacies #2: "Snapshot: Reaction!" (with Len Wein, co-feature, DC Comics, 2010)
- Fables #100: "Celebrity Burning Questions" (with Bill Willingham, Vertigo, 2010)
- Batwoman #0–24 (writer, with W. Haden Blackman; also artist on #0-5, 12-17, DC Comics, 2010–2013)
- The CBLDF Presents Liberty Annual '11: "It's Not a Trick" (script and art, Image, 2011)
- The Sandman: Overture #1–6 (with Neil Gaiman, Vertigo, 2013–2015)

=== Cover work ===
- Judge Dredd #11 (DC Comics, 1995)
- Steel #23 (DC Comics, 1996)
- The Flash #127 (DC Comics, 1997)
- Chronos #10 (DC Comics, 1999)
- Tripwire #10 (Tripwire, 1999)
- Magneto: Dark Seduction #3 (Marvel, 2000)
- X-Men Declassified #1 (Marvel, 2000)
- Astra #3 (CPM Manga, 2001)
- Gambit & Bishop: Sons of the Atom #1–6 (Marvel, 2001)
- The Titans #26–31 (DC Comics, 2001)
- Wolverine #160–161, 166, 168–169, 175, Annual 2001' (Marvel, 2001–2002)
- Deadpool #53 (Marvel, 2001)
- The Incredible Hulk #28, 33, Annual 2001 (Marvel, 2001)
- Exiles #2 (Marvel, 2001)
- Star Wards: Starfighter – Crossbones #1–3 (Dark Horse, 2002)
- Captain Marvel #27–30 (Marvel, 2002)
- Weapon X: The Draft: Agent Zero (Marvel, 2002)
- Weapon X: The Draft: Kane (Marvel, 2002)
- Weapon X: The Draft: Marrow (Marvel, 2002)
- Weapon X: The Draft: Sauron (Marvel, 2002)
- Weapon X: The Draft: Wild Child (Marvel, 2002)
- Inhumans #1–6 (Marvel, 2003)
- The Crew #1–6 (Marvel, 2003)
- Nightwing #83–85 (DC Comics, 2003)
- Jeromy Cox's Vampyrates #1 (Bloodfire Studios, 2004)
- Warlock #1–4 (Marvel, 2004)
- JSA #65–67 (DC Comics, 2004–2005)
- Adventures of Superman #635–636 (DC Comics, 2005)
- The Roach #1–2 (Black Inc!, 2006)
- Rex Mundi #1 (Dark Horse, 2006)
- Crossing Midnight #1–19 (Vertigo, 2007–2008)
- Ambush Bug: Year None #1 (DC Comics, 2008)
- Final Crisis: Superman Beyond #1–2 (DC Comics, 2008–2009)
- Detective Comics #861–863 (DC Comics, 2010)
- American Vampire #4 (Vertigo, 2010)
- Batman Beyond #1 (DC Comics, 2010)
- Wonder Woman #603 (DC Comics, 2010)
- Batman Incorporated #1–5 (DC Comics, 2011)
- Static Shock Special #1 (DC Comics, 2011)

== Awards ==
- 2001 Eisner Award for Best Single Issue for Promethea #10 with Alan Moore
- 2006 Harvey Award for Best Artist for Promethea
- 2010 Eisner Award for Best Cover Artist for Detective Comics
- 2010 Eisner Award for Best Penciller/Inker for Detective Comics
- 2012 Inkwell Award for Favorite artist known for inking his/her own pencil work for Batwoman
- 2015 Eisner Award for Best Painter/Digital Artist

=== Nominations ===
- 2000:
  - "Best Continuing Series" Eisner Award for Promethea with Alan Moore
  - "Best New Series" Eisner Award for Promethea with Alan Moore
  - "Best Penciller/Inker Team" Eisner Award for Promethea with Mick Gray
  - "Best Single Issue" Eisner Award for Promethea #3 with Alan Moore
  - "Best New Series" Harvey Award for Promethea with Alan Moore, Mick Gray and Scott Dunbier
- 2001:
  - "Best Continuing Series" Eisner Award for Promethea with Alan Moore
  - "Best Penciller/Inker Team" Eisner Award for Promethea with Mick Gray
  - "Best Artist" Harvey Award for Promethea
- 2003:
  - "Best Cover Artist" Eisner Award for Promethea
  - "Best Penciller/Inker Team" Eisner Award for Promethea with Mick Gray
- 2004: "Best Continuing or Limited Series" Harvey Award for Promethea with Alan Moore
- 2006:
  - "Best New Series" Eisner Award for Desolation Jones with Warren Ellis
  - "Best Penciller/Inker" Eisner Award for Promethea, Desolation Jones
  - "Best Publication Design" Eisner Award for Promethea #32 with Todd Klein
  - "Best Serialized Story" Eisner Award for Desolation Jones with Warren Ellis
  - "Best Single Issue or One-Shot" Eisner Award for Promethea #32 with Alan Moore
- 2010:
  - "Best Artist" Harvey Award for Detective Comics
  - "Best Cover Artist" Harvey Award for Detective Comics

Preceded by Dustin Nguyen	Detective Comics artist 2009–2010	Succeeded by Jock
Preceded by n/a	Batwoman writer 2011–2013 (with W. Haden Blackman)	Succeeded by Marc Andreyko
Preceded by n/a	Batwoman artist 2011–2013 (with Amy Reeder)	Succeeded by Trevor McCarthy
