= David Hitchcock (comics) =

English cartoonist and comic book artist

- Area: Cartoonist
- Notable works: Springheeled Jack
- Awards: "Favourite Black & White Comic Book – British" Eagle Award 2005

David Hitchcock is an English cartoonist known mainly for his small press comics work – particularly his book Springheeled Jack, for which he won an Eagle Award in 2006.

== Biography ==
Hitchcock began creating comics in 1994 while working as an editorial artist for the Derby Evening Telegraph. His first major comic, Spirit of the Highwayman, was published in 1999, followed by Whitechapel Freak and Springheeled Jack.

Hitchcock wrote the 48-page one-shot Whitechapel Freak and the three-issue mini-series Springheeled Jack, both available from Full Circle Publications.

He has also worked with writers Leah Moore and John Reppion, on various short stories for Accent comics.

Recent projects include Gothic, a collection of short stories, some original and some previously published. He is also working on a short story for Boom! Studios' Cthulhu Tales with Shane Oakley. He is currently illustrating a two-volume graphic novel called Madam Samurai, with screenwriter Gary Young, whose credits include the film Harry Brown starring Michael Caine.

== Bibliography ==
Comics work includes:

- Spirit of the Highwayman
- Whitechapel Freak (original tabloid newsprint edition −2002)
- Whitechapel Freak: Who Was The Fiend Called Jack The Ripper (Full Circle Publications, 2004)
- Springheeled Jack (3-issue mini-series, Full Circle)
- Accent Anthologies (art, with Leah Moore and John Reppion):
  - "Lusca" (in Monsters, 2006)
  - "An Molethy a an Ny-marrow (The Curse of the Un-dead)" (in Zombies, 2007)
  - "Mrs. Henry" (in Western, 2009)
- Gothic (newspaper size collection of stories, 2008)
- "a whistle for the deep" (art, with writer Shane Oakley, in Cthulhu Tales No. 12, Boom! Studios, March 2009)
- Madam Samurai Books 1 and 2 (art, with writer Gary Young, 2-volume graphic novel series, Scar Comics, 2010)
- A Mother's Love (16-page short horror story, art only) for SPLIT LIP COMICS.
- The Sixpenny Murder – written by John A. Short – Kult Kreations. A gruesome true account of a class killing in Victorian Liverpool. Just for the sake of sixpence. The comic strip format was originally produced as part of a program to aid underprivileged teens.
- Paradise Mechanism – written and drawn by David Hitchcock, plot by Kerry Hitchcock. Coloured by Matthew Soffe. For David Lloyd's ACES WEEKLY digital comic—2012
- Genesis of Scratch, Hedreck Series- Written by Laurence Allison and drawn by David Hitchcock- 2023

== Awards ==
- 2005 won the "Favourite Black & White Comic Book – British" Eagle Award for Springheeled Jack
