= The Sandman: Overture =

Comic book miniseries by Neil Gaiman

- Cover of The Sandman: Overture

Publication information
- Publisher: Vertigo
- Schedule: Bi-monthly
- Genre: Dark fantasy, supernatural fiction
- Publication date: October 2013 – September 2015
- No. of issues: 6
- Main character: Dream of the Endless

Creative team
- Written by: Neil Gaiman
- Artist: J.H. Williams III
- Colorist: Dave Stewart

The Sandman: Overture is a six-issue comic book miniseries written by Neil Gaiman with art by J.H. Williams III. A prequel to Gaiman's The Sandman series, it debuted in 2013, 17 years after the end of the regular series. A deluxe edition combining all six issues was published in November 2015. The series won the Hugo Award for Best Graphic Story in 2016.

The Sandman: Overture recounts the events leading to the first issue of the original Sandman series, in which the protagonist Dream—a powerful cosmic entity—is captured by a human occultist.

== Plot ==
On a distant planet, one aspect of Dream among the countless versions existing throughout the multiverse is suddenly destroyed. The remaining aspects of Dream gather to investigate. They discover the cause lies in Dream's past: long ago, when a catastrophic phenomenon called a "dream vortex" emerged, Dream chose not to kill the individual who carried it. As a result, the vortex's influence spread, corrupting the consciousness of the stars themselves.

Dream sets out to address the crisis, accompanied by his feline aspect and a girl named Hope whom he takes under his protection. He seeks help from his parents, Time and Night, but these primordial beings show little concern for the cosmos, and longstanding family conflicts prevent meaningful aid. Dream's siblings among the Endless likewise refuse to act beyond their designated functions.

Reaching the city inhabited by the stars with only Hope and the cat, Dream confronts a star driven mad by the vortex's influence. He is defeated, and the star kills Hope. This metaphysical upheaval triggers a war across the physical universe, leading to its annihilation.

While Dream despairs, the cat rescues some survivors from the collapsing reality and gathers them aboard a dream-ship. Hope reappears as a representative of the dead. At Dream’s request, Hope speaks on his behalf and asks the gathered survivors to envision the world as it should be. Under the influence of Dream's sand, the thousand survivors sleep and dream. Drawing on these dreams, Dream reconstructs the entire universe and restores cosmic order.

Having exhausted his power, Dream returns to Earth, where the events of the original series begin. The story reveals that an estranged family member, his sibling Desire, had secretly aided him in feline form. Although the universe has been overwritten and the preceding events technically no longer exist, fragmented memories persist among those involved.

== Publication history ==
=== Background ===
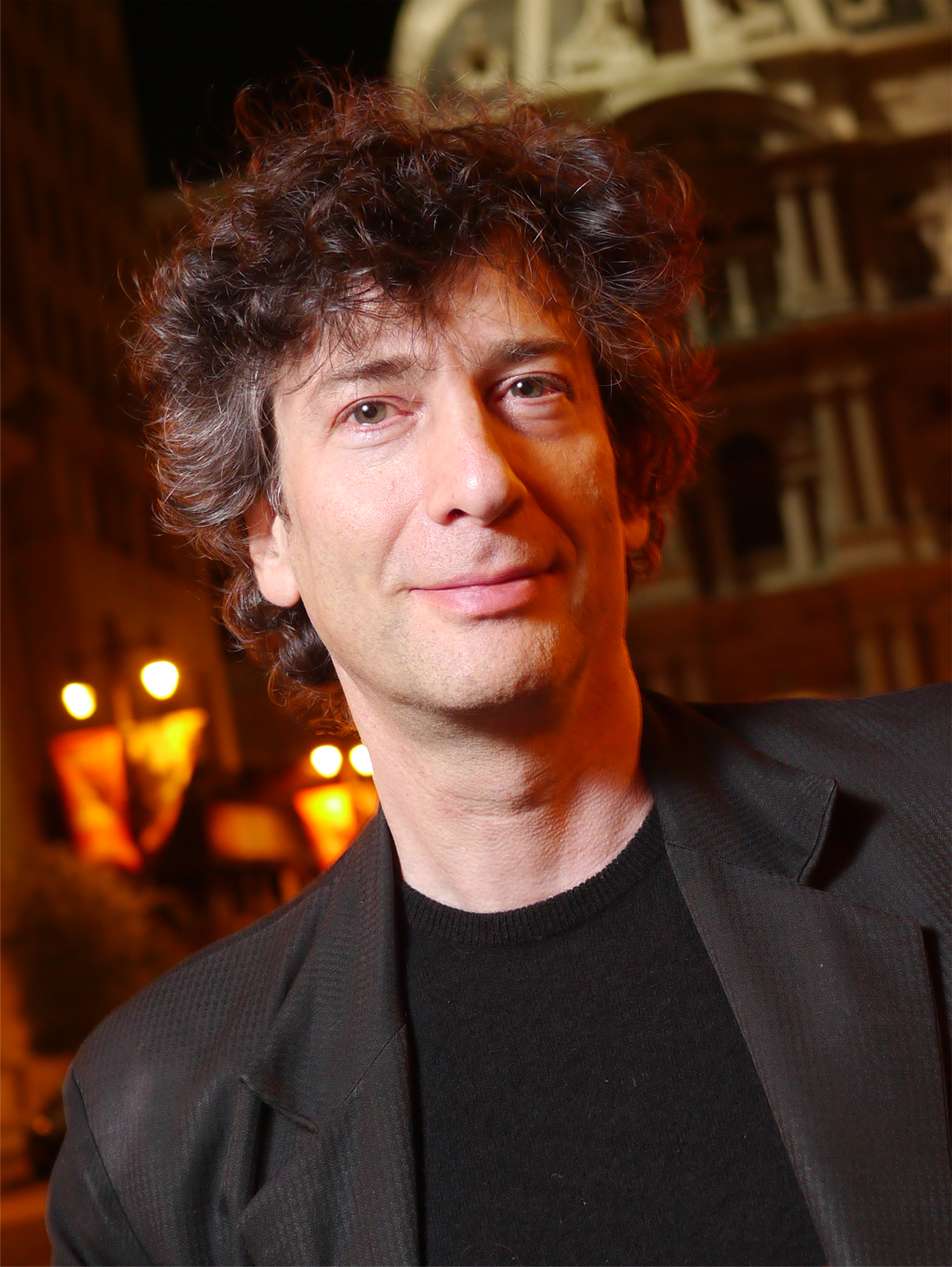
Neil Gaiman (2013)

This work is a prequel to The Sandman, a comic book series published by DC Comics from 1988 to 1995. The original series combined elements of fantasy, horror, mythology, and classical literature within a contemporary narrative. The Sandman attracted readers beyond the traditional comic-book audience, including a substantial number of women, and its success outside the typical superhero-oriented market contributed to the establishment of DC’s Vertigo imprint. The series also received honors such as the World Fantasy Award. Following The Sandman, Neil Gaiman gained wider recognition and went on to develop a career spanning novels and screen productions, where he also received critical attention.

At Gaiman’s insistence that the story had reached its natural conclusion, The Sandman ended with issue #75. At the time, it was uncommon for a comics publisher to conclude a successful ongoing series in accordance with an author’s wishes. Although the main series was complete, Gaiman retained ideas for stories that had not been incorporated into it, which would later form the basis for The Sandman: Overture.

=== Development and publication ===
In 2008, marking the twentieth anniversary of The Sandman, Gaiman proposed to DC Comics that a new limited series be produced. Despite the growing prevalence of the graphic novel format, he chose to develop the project as a regularly issued comic book series, citing a desire for contemporary readers to experience the anticipation created by unresolved cliffhangers between issues. The project was initially developed under the working title SANDMAN ZERO.

After an extended period of internal development at DC Comics, The Sandman: Overture was launched in 2013, coinciding with the twenty-fifth anniversary of the original series, as a six-issue bimonthly publication under the Vertigo imprint. The release schedule ultimately fell behind its original plan, and completion took approximately two years. The New York Times reported that DC sought to revitalize its Vertigo imprint, which had struggled to build an audience, and identified The Sandman: Overture as the most anticipated of several new series launched as part of that effort. Promotional efforts included billboard displays in New York’s Times Square and financial support for marketing campaigns at comic-book retailers.

Although a spin-off short-story collection, The Sandman: Endless Nights, had been published in 2003, Overture marked the first new long-form narrative to directly complement the main storyline of the original series. In 2013, the year of its launch, the title was featured on the cover of the official guidebook for San Diego Comic-Con, the world’s largest comic-book convention.

== Production ==
=== Creative background ===
Gaiman has stated that he was concerned that readers who found the new work different from their expectations might react in an overly critical manner, dismissing it as “not Sandman.” He recalled that similar critical reactions had accompanied the original series during its initial publication, when later installments were frequently criticized by some readers. Although such reactions persisted through to the final issue, the series came to be widely regarded as successful, leading Gaiman to place less weight on short-term responses when approaching new work. He also said that, although he initially feared losing the sensibility that shaped the earlier series, the characters developed naturally during the writing process.

J. H. Williams III, who served as Overture’s artist, had long admired the series. In the late 1980s, Williams became interested in emerging trends in comics that departed from conventional superhero format and began reading The Sandman from its initial publication. He later identified the short story “A Dream of a Thousand Cats” (#18) as particularly influential.

Following his professional debut, Williams became associated with intricate and experimental page layouts. His work for DC Comics includes Promethea, through which Neil Gaiman first became aware of his distinctive visual style, and Batwoman, where his artwork was noted for a broad range of approaches, including painterly techniques and ligne claire, as well as frequent use of large double-page spreads incorporating symbolic imagery. A similar flexibility in materials, visual styles, and page design is evident in The Sandman: Overture, where these elements are employed to convey perspectives drawn from multiple realms within the DC Universe.

=== Production process ===
Production proceeded through close collaboration between Gaiman and Williams. After sharing the broad outline of the story, Williams prepared a list of visual motifs, which Gaiman incorporated when developing the script; among these, cats assumed a prominent role. According to Williams, Gaiman did not adhere rigidly to an initial plan but allowed the narrative to develop through the writing process, while Williams likewise emphasized spontaneity and at times revised the originally specified panel structure when devising strong double-page compositions. Gaiman remarked that approximately “30 percent” of the composition was his own and “70 percent” belonged to Williams. He noted that this approach included assigning visual challenges—such as depicting one of Dream’s aspects in the form a flower—that he himself could not readily envision.

Williams completed the artwork through the inking stage, adding gray tones and washes to produce watercolor-like gradations. With the exception of certain light effects, the pages were created entirely using analog techniques. Digital coloring was subsequently carried out by colorist Dave Stewart. Williams occasionally applied color by hand for the intended visual effect. To maintain quality, production advanced at approximately two to two and a half pages per week, contributing to delays in the publication schedule.

Letterer Todd Klein, who had provided distinctive custom fonts throughout the series, had by this time transitioned to a fully digital workflow, allowing him to experiment with approaches such as semi-transparent lettering, which was used exclusively in the Special Edition. Cover artist Dave McKean had similarly moved from analog to digital methods over the course of the original series, and for this project emphasized the coexistence of both approaches. For example, the cover of issue #5 features an analog mixed-media composition combining photography and digital art with painted elements, textures of Chinese paper, and natural materials.

== Themes ==
In this work, several mysteries raised in the original series are clarified, offering new perspectives on characters and past events. Gaiman has described Overture as structurally circular, with its ending reconnecting to the beginning in a manner comparable to a Möbius strip, encouraging the original series to be reread from a new perspective.

The character of Dream is examined in greater depth. The original series began with Dream’s release after decades of captivity, and much of its narrative traced the transformation of his rigid and fastidious personality. Gaiman has stated that by introducing the parents of the Endless in Overture, the work provides insight into Dream’s character formation. Literary scholar Kathryn Hume has suggested that Dream’s emotional distance in earlier stories can be interpreted as rooted in these familial relationships. The moment that initiates Dream’s own transformation is also depicted in this work.

Several commentators have situated The Sandman: Overture within the broader thematic framework of The Sandman. Leah Schnelbach of Tor.com identified recurring questions— whether individuals can change, how death should be accepted, and the extent to which fate governs existence, as well as the role of narrative in engaging with these issues. Jennifer Chen has similarly noted that longstanding thematic tensions in the series, such as those between free will and destiny, or between mercy and cruelty, are revisited in this work.

Other critics have emphasized the darker tone and sense of inevitability that characterize the work. Stuart Warren observed that the optimism often associated with Gaiman’s prose fiction is largely absent, and that the work continues the tragic trajectory of the main series. Natalie Phillips noted that the title Overture evokes not only a beginning but also the inevitability of an ending.

=== Genre and influences ===
While the original series encompassed genres including dark fantasy, high fantasy, and historical fiction, science fiction played only a limited role. The Sandman: Overture adopts a large-scale space opera framework. Stuart Warren of Sequart described the work as a science fantasy, noting its large-scale galactic setting and its use of Doctor Who–like thought experiments. Williams noted that the decision to evoke 1970s “cosmic” comics emerged through discussions between him and Gaiman. Set within the DC Universe, the series also incorporates minor DC science-fiction characters, including Mogo the Living Planet and the Space Canine Patrol Agents.

== Artwork ==
The page design in The Sandman: Overture is highly varied, reflecting J. H. Williams III’s visual style established in earlier works. The series includes pages densely composed of collage-like imagery, others dominated by negative space, and several fold-out spreads extending across four pages.

Williams has stated that his approach involves identifying nuances and symbolic elements within the script and developing visual motifs that emphasize them. In Overture, he also aimed to make imagery accessible to first-time readers; for instance, scenes featuring the Corinthian, a recurring antagonist from the original series, depict panels shaped like human teeth and framed by gums, visually reinforcing his motif. In a sequence depicting Dream’s encounter with the three Fates, the page layout takes the form of an open hand, with palm lines functioning as panel divisions.

Visual styles and techniques vary according to narrative context. According to Kathryn Hume, characters’ psychological states in Overture are conveyed less through dialogue than through shifts in visual style and color palette, distinguishing the work from conventional graphic novels and earlier works of Gaiman and Williams. In scenes where characters from multiple worlds converge, Williams employed a range of visual styles drawing on artists such as Jack Kirby, Sergio Toppi, Pablo Picasso, and Gustav Klimt, allowing differences in the backgrounds of their respective worlds to be suggested within single, wordless panels.

When depicting realms outside linear time, Williams employed fluid layouts that deliberately depart from standard panel conventions, alongside vivid, flat color schemes influenced by the work of Peter Max, creating what he described as a "psychedelic" visual effect.

== Reception ==
=== Sales ===
The Sandman: Overture achieved commercial success in both single-issue and collected formats. Upon its release in October 2013, The Sandman: Overture ranked eighth on the monthly comic-book sales chart compiled by Diamond Comic Distributors, which at the time was the dominant distributor for comic specialty stores in North America. In terms of single-issue revenue, issue #1 ranked twenty-fifth among all comic titles released in 2013.

The hardcover The Sandman: Overture Deluxe Edition, released in November 2015, topped Diamond’s monthly rankings in the collected editions category for the direct market. It also ranked second for the month in the adult graphic novel category in sales data from general bookstores compiled by Nielsen BookScan.

=== Critical response ===
IGN described The Sandman: Overture as more than a supplementary prequel, characterizing it as one of the most ambitious entries in The Sandman series, with Gaiman’s dialogue and narration giving it the feel of “a lost fairy tale.” New York Journal of Books and Tor.com similarly praised the series for creating a new reading experience without relying on nostalgia while maintaining the narrative tone of the original work.

By contrast, a review of the first issue in The Comics Journal was critical, arguing that the elevated prose felt “pedantic,” and that artwork where the creators’ intentions were evident throughout hindered immersion. The review stated that the work leaves no room for mystery to emerge for the reader, resulting in loss of the “Romantic imagination” that had characterized The Sandman series. Leah Schnelbach of Tor.com also noted that while Overture imposed a clearer through line on the series’ overall plot and heightened its thematic coherence, it did so at the expense of interpretive openness.

Williams’s artwork, together with Dave Stewart’s coloring, has been noted for its fluidity, vibrancy, and affinity with pop art aesthetics. IGN’s Benjamin Bailey wrote that its appeal as fine art justified the comic’s price point and praised Williams’s experimental approach. IGN observed that in creating a dreamlike sensibility appropriate to the series, Williams stood alongside long-established cover artist Dave McKean. Leah Schnelbach further emphasized Williams’s ability to balance cosmic scale with interior monologue through unconventional panel compositions. The Christian Science Monitor likewise praised not only Williams’s stylistic range but also Dave Stewart’s varied coloring and Todd Klein’s lettering, which assigns distinct fonts to supernatural characters.

=== Awards ===
In 2015, J. H. Williams III received the Eisner Award for Best Painter/Multimedia Artist for his work on The Sandman: Overture. That same year, the collected edition was selected by Amazon.com as the best comic/graphic novel of the year and was also included on The Washington Post’s list of best graphic novels.

The Sandman: Overture was awarded the 2016 Hugo Award for Best Graphic Story. The win was controversial because the protest group Sad Puppies supported its nomination. Gaiman called their involvement "disappointing" and the reaction to them an "unfortunate mess" in his acceptance speech, but said that withdrawing from consideration would have given the Sad Puppies "too much acknowledgment".

== Bibliography ==
=== Comic book series ===
- The Sandman: Overture

Six issues, released from October 2013 to September 2015. Each issue was released with multiple cover variants.

- The Sandman: Overture Special Edition

Six issues, published from November 2013 to October 2015. This edition included additional material such as creator interviews and supplemental artwork.

=== Collected editions ===
- The Sandman: Overture Deluxe Edition

Hardcover edition published in 2015. ISBN 978-1-401248-96-3.

- The Sandman: Overture

Paperback edition published in 2016. ISBN 978-1-401265-19-9.

- The Absolute Sandman: Overture

Oversized hardcover published in 2018. It includes the complete uncolored original artwork. The volume received the Ringo Award for Best Book Design in 2019. ISBN 978-1-401280-47-5.

- The Sandman: Overture 30th Anniversary Edition

Anniversary paperback edition published in 2019. ISBN 978-1-401294-52-6.

- The Sandman: Overture – J. H. Williams III Gallery Edition

Published in 2020. A large format (12 in. × 17 in.) hardcover volume reproducing the complete unlettered original artwork at full size, with reduced lettered pages included for reading. ISBN 978-1-401291-03-7.

- The Sandman: Book Six

Published in 2023 as part of a large-format collected edition series compiling the entire Sandman saga. It also includes other spin-off works such as The Sandman: The Dream Hunters. ISBN 978-1-779524-01-0.
