= Skid Kidd =

Comic strip by Rod McKie

Skid Kidd is a comic strip by Rod McKie. It appeared in the IPC comic book Buster between 1984 and 1985.

The central character, Mike Kidd, is sitting around one day when out of the blue a large crate, containing a bike, lands in his garden. The bike is actually a secret weapon going under the acronym S.A.M (Super Action Machine) and the bad guys who stole the bike want it back.

The comic began as an ongoing comedy adventure where a group of villains with weird and wonderful devices came up with ever more desperate and zany plans to recover the bike. Over time, the format of the strip changed from continuing cliffhanger-style story to the preferred IPC format of a gag-a-page.

During its run, Mike Kidd's adventures were used by the Raleigh Bicycle Company to promote a competition for their Vektar bike, which was given as a prize to the reader who solved Skid Kidd's villain problem in a special two-part episode.

McKie made it clear from the start that he wanted the character to look like "key" scenes from an animation storyboard rather than a conventional comic page. The character and the backgrounds were drawn flat, with a rigid, inflexible nib, in order that the eye of the reader should not be distracted by thick and thin lines.
