= Desolation Jones =

2005–2007 comic books by Warren Ellis

- Desolation Jones

Publication information
- Publisher: Wildstorm
- Schedule: Monthly
- Format: Ongoing series
- Publication date: July 2005 – February 2007
- No. of issues: 8
- Main character(s): Desolation Jones; Jeronimus Corneliszoon; Emily Crowe; Tapper

Creative team
- Created by: Warren Ellis
- Written by: Warren Ellis
- Artist(s): J. H. Williams III; Danijel Zezelj
- Colorist: José Villarrubia

Desolation Jones was a bimonthly comic book series written by Warren Ellis. Art for the first six-issue storyline was provided by J.H. Williams III and José Villarrubia. The interrupted second storyline was illustrated by Danijel Zezelj and Villarrubia. The series is published by the Wildstorm imprint of DC Comics; it was launched in July 2005.

The story follows the former MI6 agent Jones.

Film producer David Friendly announced in 2008, while the comic was in production limbo, that he intended to adapt Desolation Jones as a feature film. However, when questioned Ellis himself insisted that "All I can tell you is that we've never heard from David Friendly."

The series' last issue, No. 8, came out in February 2007. The project has technically been on hiatus since then, but as of 2012, Warren Ellis has stated the series will probably not return.

== Characters ==
Michael (Desolation) Jones

The story's protagonist and title character is Michael Jones, a former agent of British intelligence service MI6, who earns a long record of drunkenness and misconduct within the organisation. This is possibly due to a break-up with a woman only mentioned as "Jessica." In lieu of being discharged for his behaviour, he was chosen to participate in a secret government project called the "Desolation Test." Jones believes he would be taking part in an innocuous research study, but instead becomes an unwilling human test subject. Part of the test was being strapped to a hospital bed for a full year without being allowed to sleep and subjected to endless scenes of death. Jones is the only known survivor of this program. To mark him as a potential biological threat, the British government brands a biohazard symbol on the underside of his left forearm and a "Desolation 01" (i.e. test subject #01) brand on his right forearm.

The Desolation Test caused numerous physical changes. He has become a scarred and frail figure with grey skin and chalk white hair, who must avoid direct sunlight, although the exact effects it would have upon him are not revealed. He suffers from chronic pain and impotence. Mentally, Jones exhibits no fear, remorse, or any other emotion, and is numb to killing people, many times with his bare hands. He manages to take down a much larger opponent in the first issue by gouging out his eye with his index finger, remarking: "Winning a fight isn't about being the strongest or being a clever boxer, it's about being more willing to permanently fuck up the other guy." He heals poorly when wounded, although this may be a result of his constant drug abuse rather than due to the Desolation Test. Even in the best of times, he has hallucinations of half-naked, sometimes bloody angels. The character also wears a trademark orange trench coat, an oxygen mask, and a pair of goggles, presumably to avoid exposure to sunlight. On several occasions he demonstrates above-average reflexes, as though his wasted body still perfectly responds to his MI6 training.

He lives in Los Angeles, which is secretly maintained by the US Government as a veritable prison for ex-agents of numerous intelligence organisations. The ex-agents are legally invisible within the city, but are not allowed to leave without being hunted for going rogue. Jones makes a living as a private investigator, only doing jobs for other members of/within the intelligence community.

== Story arc #1: Made in England ==
The initial story arc (Made in England) involves Jones aiding an affluent, elderly collector named Colonel Nigh in retrieving stolen property, namely the lost pornographic films of Adolf Hitler. Jones is assisted by an assortment of bizarre companions and ex-intelligence agents. There is Robina, a woman skilled in creating robotic miniature explosives, and Emily, who as the result of CIA experiments, emits constant pheromones that cause almost animalistic fear and revulsion in people around her (save Jones, because of the Desolation Test). He also receives assistance from an ex-agent/doctor, Dr. Tapper, who helps him with his wounds and even with a firefight.

Jones must unravel the schemes of Nigh's three daughters, work his way through the seedy underbelly of the pornographic industry, survive secrets of his own past and deal with his agent (whose CIA-modified stomach allows him to only eat four times a year, but when he does, requires him to consume vast amounts of protein, sourced directly from live cows).

== Story arc #2: To Be in England ==
The second story arc opens four years before the present with a man named Bob Sauer, codenamed Deep Miner, being questioned by the US Air Force as a form of debriefing. The entire encounter is an effort to have Bob Sauer reveal information, but he claims to have done nothing wrong. After 4 days of debriefing he returns to his apartment to be attacked and killed by John Asher. John Asher is then introduced to a cleaner Michael Jones.

In the present Jones is contacted by Jeronimus Corneliszoon stating that John Asher is dead. After the fallout from MI6, it is revealed that Asher was brought into the same US government protection as Jones. When visiting the hotel room where Asher was killed, Jones finds a notepad in one of the bed posts that belonged to Asher. The notepad contains a list of names, phone numbers and addresses. One of the names in the notepad is a film producer named Evers Chance (named after a line from the poem Baseball's Sad Lexicon).

Evers is filming a biographic film about Philip K. Dick and Jones begins to notice co-incidences related to the writer. The cab driver on the journey to Evers Chance's house mentions that he grew up being so close to Philip K. Dick that he referred to him as "Uncle Phil". The notepad Jones found in the motel room also contained the letters PKD. Dr. Tapper had also found a book in Jones' couch by Philip K. Dick earlier that morning.

The second arc is left with Jones at Emily Crowe's apartment in considerable pain, passing out while trying to piece together information.

== Collections ==
- Desolation Jones Vol. 1: Made in England (ISBN 140121150X) Collects Desolation Jones #1–6
- Desolation Jones – The Biohazard Edition (ISBN 1534350756) Collects Desolation Jones #1-6

== Cultural references ==
Jeronimus Corneliszoon is a reference to Michael Moorcock's Jerry Cornelius.
