= Guy Burnet =

British actor (active 2002– )

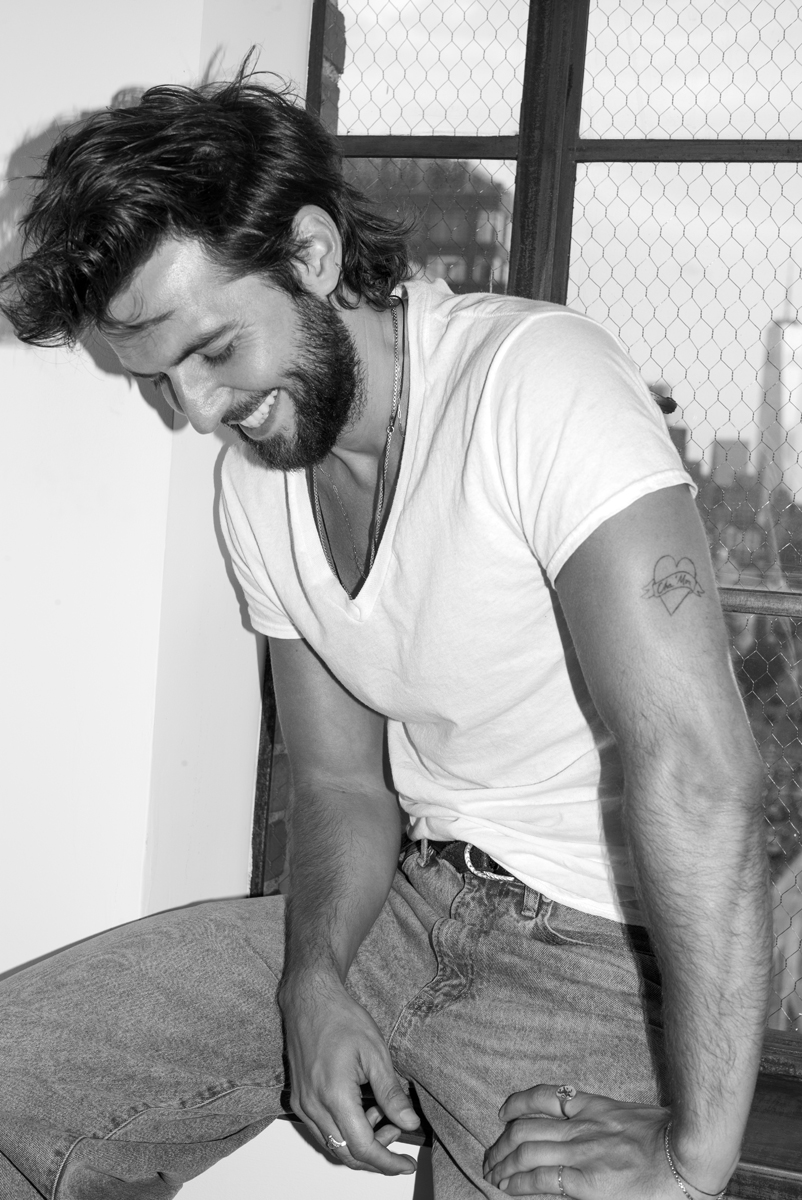
- Burnet in 2025.
- Years active: 2002–present
- Known for: Landman (2025); Counterpart (2018–2019); FUBAR (2025); Oppenheimer (2023); Dead for a Dollar (2022)
- Website: www.guyburnet.com

Guy Burnet is a British actor who has worked in film, television, and theatre. He had a notable supporting role in Christopher Nolan’s Oppenheimer.

== Early life ==
Burnet attended Holland Park School where his interest in drama first developed, taking an A level in the subject.

Before becoming an actor, Burnet aspired to become a professional footballer. He attended Queens Park Rangers Football School. He subsequently undertook trials and played in various locations throughout Europe. He also trained as a Boxer and in MMA, later directing a documentary on WBU featherweight title holder Derry Mathews.

He still plays football, taking part in a football match on 1 June 2007 at the new Wembley Stadium prior to England's first match at the stadium. In September 2007, he played for England in an England v Russia charity match in support of the Give Life Foundation.

== Acting career ==
=== Film ===
Burnet appeared in Oppenheimer (2023), portraying British physicist George C. Eltenton.

Burnet co-starred in the western thriller Dead for a Dollar (2022), directed by Walter Hill and featuring Christoph Waltz and Willem Dafoe.

Upcoming projects include Reykjavik, a dramatic thriller starring Jeff Daniels and Jared Harris, and The Beast, a high-profile action film featuring Samuel L. Jackson.

Earlier film work includes lead roles in Two Jacks opposite Sienna Miller and the war drama Age of Heroes with Sean Bean.

Burnet played a supporting role in David Koepp's crime caper Mortdecai opposite Johnny Depp and Ewan McGregor, and co-starred in the musical comedy Pitch Perfect 3 alongside Anna Kendrick.

Additional credits include the psychological thriller Jacob’s Ladder and the Michael Caton-Jones–directed action film Asher.

=== Television ===
Burnet joined the cast of Hollyoaks in 2002 as Craig Dean, a main character. During his time on the show, he was central to a popular and culturally significant storyline involving his character’s relationship with John Paul McQueen, which remains one of the most talked-about and ground breaking arcs in the show's history. On 3 August 2007, producer Bryan Kirkwood confirmed Burnet's departure, calling him "an amazing actor" and noting that "he has really come into his own."

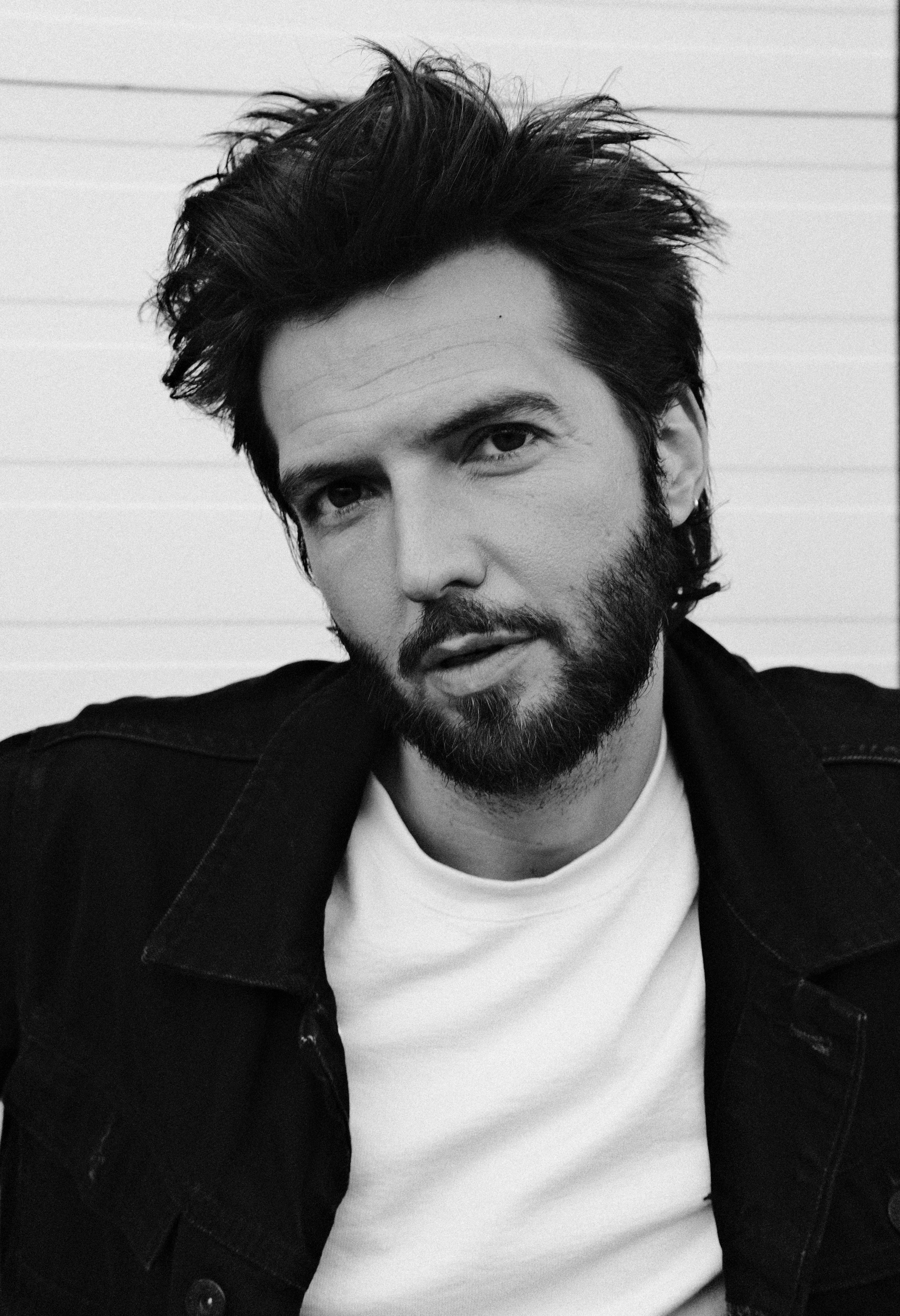
Burnet in 2025, by Maxine Clement

In 2009, Burnet played "Pinklady" in Moving On for the BBC. After several years on the New York stage, Burnet transitioned into U.S. television and film. He appeared in the Showtime drama Ray Donovan, and later joined the third season of The Affair in the recurring role of Mike Cornwell.

In 2017, Burnet joined the second season of Amazon's Hand of God starring Ron Perlman. He also appeared in Counterpart opposite J.K. Simmons.

He was also featured in the Bryan Cranston–produced Amazon series Philip K. Dick's Electric Dreams alongside Terrence Howard and Anna Paquin.

Burnet later led the cast of the Amazon-BBC sci-fi drama The Feed, based on the novel by Nick Clark Windo. He played Tom Hatfield, a psychologist navigating a world shaped by implanted technology, with David Thewlis playing his father. The series drew praise for its eerie relevance and Burnet’s grounded performance in the lead role.

More recently, Burnet stars as Chips in the Netflix action-comedy series FUBAR alongside Arnold Schwarzenegger. His portrayal of Chips — a character brought to life through a blend of vulnerability, bravado, humor, and intensity — was noted for its distinctive charisma and earned praise as a standout performance.

In 2025–2026, Burnet appeared as Charlie Newsom in the Paramount+ drama series Landman, created by Taylor Sheridan, alongside Billy Bob Thornton. The series became one of the most-watched original programmes, drawing record viewership for the platform during its run.

=== Theatre ===
In 2012, Burnet appeared in the Off-Broadway premiere production of Murder in the First, adapted by Dan Gordon from his own screenplay for the 1995 film of the same name. One reviewer called his performance during the six-week run, as defence attorney Henry Willard Davidson, "excellent".

== Filmography ==
Key
| † | Denotes films that have not yet been released |

=== Film ===
| Year | Title | Role | Notes |
|---|---|---|---|
| 2004 | Time/Out | Kieron DiMack | Short film |
| 2006 | Voyer | Guy Burns | |
| 2010 | Luster | Bansky | |
| 2010 | Baseline | Ricky | |
| 2010 | Pig | Man | |
| 2011 | Age of Heroes | Commando Riley | |
| 2011 | Two Jacks | Paul | |
| 2012 | Rites of Passage | Mojo | |
| 2015 | Mortdecai | Maurice | |
| 2015 | Day Out of Days | E.J. | |
| 2016 | The Have-Nots | Jim | |
| 2017 | Pitch Perfect 3 | Theo | |
| 2018 | Asher | Lyor | |
| 2019 | Jacob's Ladder | Hoffman | |
| 2022 | Dead for a Dollar | William Palmer aka English Bill | |
| 2022 | Bed Rest | Daniel Rivers | |
| 2023 | Oppenheimer | George Eltenton | |
| 2026 | The Brink of War | Alexander | |
| 2026 | The Beast † | TBA | Post-production |
| TBA | Scorn † | TBA | Filming |

=== Television ===
| Year | Title | Role | Notes |
|---|---|---|---|
| 2002–2007 | Hollyoaks | Craig Dean | |
| 2009 | Moving On | Pinklady | Episode: "Dress to Impress" |
| 2010 | Sonny with a Chance | Trey Brothers | Episode: "Sonny with a Song" |
| 2011 | The Royal | Lenny Lomax | Episode: "Dead Air" |
| 2015 | Ray Donovan | Casey Finney | 3 episodes |
| 2016 | The Affair | Mike Cornwall | 2 episodes |
| 2016 | Chicago Fire | Grant | 6 episodes |
| 2017 | Hand of God | Raymond Kelly | 8 episodes |
| 2017 | Philip K. Dick's Electric Dreams | Colin | Episode: "Real Life" |
| 2018–2019 | Counterpart | Claude Lambert | 7 episodes |
| 2019 | The Feed | Tom Hatfield | Main role |
| 2023 | Minx | Graham | 2 episodes |
| 2024 | 3 Body Problem | Rufus | |
| 2024 | American Horror Stories | John | Episode: "Clone" |
| 2025 | FUBAR | Theodore Chips | Main cast (season 2) |
| 2025–2026 | Landman | Charlie Newsom | Recurring Role (season 2) |
