= Gary Young (screenwriter) =

British screenwriter

Gary Young is a British screenwriter who is perhaps best known for writing the film Harry Brown starring Michael Caine.

He has also written Madam Samurai a graphic novel series with Eagle Award-winning artist David Hitchcock.

== Films ==
- Shooters (2002)
- Spivs (2004)
- The Last Drop (2005)
- The Tournament (2009)
- Harry Brown (2009)
- Two Graves (2018)
- Henry (TBA)

== Comics ==
- Madam Samurai (with art by David Hitchcock, 2-volume graphic novel series, Scar Comics, 2010, 2011)
