= Springheeled Jack (comics) =

British small press comic by David Hitchcock

Springheeled Jack is a British small press comic by David Hitchcock, based on the folklore character of Spring Heeled Jack.

In 2006 it also appeared in the small press section of the Judge Dredd Megazine #245.

== Publication ==
It was released as a three issue comic followed by other one-shots, which were collected in a hardback volume Strange Visitor.

Hitchcock also supplied a Springheeled Jack cover to Redeye #4, in which the character was featured.

== Awards ==
- 2005 won the Eagle Award for Favourite Black & White Comic Book - British

== See also ==
- British small press comics
- History of the British comic
- London Falling, a comic also based on figures from British folklore.
