= Shawn McManus =

American artist (born 1958)

- Born: June 30, 1958 (age 68) Brookline, Massachusetts, U.S.
- Areas: Cartoonist, Artist
- Notable works: Cinderella: From Fabletown with Love; Fables; Fairest; The Saga of the Swamp Thing

Shawn McManus (born June 30, 1958) is an American artist who has worked extensively over three decades for DC Comics and other companies, notably for DC's Vertigo imprint including the Fables series.

== Comics ==
Born in Brookline, Massachusetts, McManus entered the comics field in the early 1980s with work for Heavy Metal and DC Comics. For the June 1983 issue of Heavy Metal he collaborated with Bhob Stewart and John Coffey on "Zenobia". Six months later, McManus and Stewart teamed with Jim McDermott on "Symbiosis", also in Heavy Metal (December 1983). He drew the Green Arrow backup feature in Detective Comics in 1983–1984. McManus gained wider attention when he illustrated two issues of The Saga of the Swamp Thing written by Alan Moore.

McManus worked with writer Todd Klein on Omega Men, creating Zirral and other characters for that series. He has drawn issues of Doctor Fate and Batman: Legends of the Dark Knight. He collaborated with Neil Gaiman on the "Fables & Reflections" and "A Game of You" story arcs in The Sandman. McManus' other Sandman credits include The Sandman Presents: Taller Tales and a pair of limited series about the witch Thessaly written by Bill Willingham. McManus' artwork for Marvel Comics includes Peter Parker: Spider-Man Annual '97 and Daredevil #351. In an interview, John Rozum, who scripted that issue of Daredevil, recalled:

I thought Shawn McManus's art was great. I'd like to work with him again sometime, though we didn't really work together here. At the time I wrote it, I had no idea who'd be drawing it. Shawn and I have never even met or spoken with each other. I always write full script though, and unlike some other artists, Shawn actually pays attention to the script. I think his artwork was a nice pairing with the story.

McManus has contributed to titles from a variety of other publishers, including Atomeka Press (A1), Dark Horse Comics (Cheval Noir), Exhibit A Press (Wolff & Byrd: Counselors of the Macabre), First Comics (Grimjack), Image Comics (Supreme), Malibu Comics (The Man Called A-X), and DC Comics' Paradox Press (The Big Book Of Freaks). He worked on Leah Moore and John Reppion's Wild Girl (Wildstorm, 2004–2005) with J. H. Williams III, about 13-year-old Rosa Torez who discovers that she can communicate with animals. In 2007, he did an eight-issue run on Aquaman: Sword of Atlantis and an issue of The Creeper for DC.

He illustrated Cinderella: From Fabletown with Love in 2010 and Cinderella: Fables Are Forever the following year. He was one of several artists to contribute to the Fairest in All the Land graphic novel. In October 2022, writer J. M. DeMatteis announced the founding of his own comics publisher company named Spellbound Comics. Through a Kickstarter campaign, he presented the DeMultiverse, which included Layla in the Lands of After drawn by Shawn McManus.

== Children's art ==
Writer-illustrator and lecturer Mark McKenna, creator of the Banana Tail children's book series, described his long association with McManus that led to their Banana Tail: The Early Years (2009) color print:

I met Shawn McManus in the DC Comics offices back in late 1985. I was up at DC Comics to meet with an editor or show samples, I forget, the old brain is failing me here. But I do recall Shawn sitting in with the editor who I was about to have a meeting with. At the time, Shawn was drawing Swamp Thing, and I was delighted to see his lively, bouncy and very refreshing art style. Little did I know that within a year we would be an art team along with writer J. M. DeMatteis on DC's Doctor Fate series... We worked together for six months on Doctor Fate until the DC editor moved me to another book. I haven't had any creative contact with Shawn since that time in 1987. We really never spoke during the time we worked together. I was still very new to the business and didn't think to call and collaborate with Shawn to get his sensibilities about direction and vision for the book. No contact with Shawn until a few brief comic con "how ya doing's?", and an eventual reconnect through our mutual art rep, Bob Shaw... Bob had this idea that Shawn should work with me and create some ultra cool Banana Tail painting... Seeing Bob Shaw's excitement, Shawn then saw the potential in Banana Tail.

== Television ==
In 1987, McManus worked on the animated series Dinosaucers. For the TV series Tales from the Crypt, McManus and Mike Vosburg illustrated comic book covers designed to look like the original 1950s comics. The McManus Crypt cover is seen in the first episode ("The Man Who Was Death").

== Awards and nominations ==
1985 Jack Kirby Award nomination with Alan Moore for Best Single Issue ("Pog" in The Saga of the Swamp Thing #32).

== Comics bibliography ==
=== Dark Horse Comics ===
- Cheval Noir #48 (1993)

=== DC Comics ===
- Aquaman: Sword of Atlantis #50–57 (2007)
- Batman: Legends of the Dark Knight #44–45 (1993)
- Countdown to Mystery #5 (2008)
- Creeper #5 (2007)
- Deadman #7–9 (2002)
- Detective Comics #533–545 (Green Arrow) (1983–1984)
- Doctor Fate #1–11, 13–20, 22–24 (1988–1991)
- Elvira's House of Mystery #1, 4 (1986)
- Green Arrow vol. 2 #51–52 (1991)
- Helmet of Fate: Detective Chimp #1 (2007)
- Legion of Super-Heroes vol. 3 #27 (1986)
- Legion of Super Heroes in the 31st Century #16 (2008)
- Lobo #30, 37 (1996–1997)
- Man Called A-X vol. 2 #1–6 (1997–1998)
- New Talent Showcase #4 (1984)
- Omega Men #25–31, 33, 35, 38, Annual #2 (1985–1986)
- The Saga of the Swamp Thing #28, 32 (1984–1985)
- The Sandman #31–33, 35–37 (1991–1992)
- Shadowpact #8 (2007)
- Swamp Thing #111, 116, Annual #3 (1987–1992)
- Talent Showcase #18 (1985)
- Who's Who in the DC Universe #10 (1991)
- Who's Who: The Definitive Directory of the DC Universe #3, 7, 9–10, 17–18, 20 (1985–1986)

==== America's Best Comics ====
- Tom Strong #19, 27 (2003–2004)
- Tom Strong's Terrific Tales #7 (2003)

==== Paradox Press ====
- The Big Book Of Freaks (1996)

==== Vertigo ====
- Cinderella: Fables Are Forever #1–6 (2011)
- Cinderella: From Fabletown with Love #1–6 (2010)
- The Dreaming #31, 39, 50 (1998–2000)
- Fables #51, 110–111, 114–124, 144, 147 (2006–2015)
- Fables: The Wolf Among Us #1–2 (2015)
- Fairest #7, 21–26 (2012–2014)
- Fairest in All the Land HC (2014)
- Sandman Presents: The Thessaliad #1–4 (2002)
- Sandman Presents: Thessaly: Witch for Hire #1–4 (2004)
- Unwritten: Tommy Taylor and the Ship That Sank Twice HC (2013)
- Vertigo: Winter's Edge #3 (2000)
- The Witching Hour vol. 3 #1 (2013)

==== Wildstorm ====
- Wild Girl #1–6 (2005)

=== HM Communications ===
- Heavy Metal #v7#9 (1983)

=== Image Comics ===
- Deathblow #18 (1995)
- Shadowhawk Gallery #1 (1994)
- Supreme #7–8 (1993)

=== Malibu Comics ===
- Man Called A-X #0, #1–4 (1994–1995)

=== Marvel Comics ===
- Daredevil #351–352 (1996)
- Dream Team #1 (1995)
- Excalibur: XX Crossing #1 (1992)
- Marvel Comics Presents #109–111, 113–118 (1992)
- Namor, the Sub-Mariner #38, 41 (1993)
- Punisher Annual #6 (1993)
- The Punisher War Journal #50 (1993)
- The Sensational Spider-Man '96 #1 (1996)
- Spider-Man Annual '97 #1 (1997)
- Spider-Man Unlimited #10 (1995)
- Ultraforce/Spider-Man #1A (1996)
- Wolverine/Nick Fury: Scorpio Rising #1 (1994)
