= Pig (2010 film) =

- Movie Poster
- Directed by: Adam Mason
- Screenplay by: Andrew Howard; Adam Mason
- Cinematography: Aaj Satan
- Edited by: Adam Mason
- Music by: Phil Bloomberg, Tim Polecat, Rod Rodgers
- Distributed by: Pig Pictures
- Release date: 2010
- Running time: 80 minutes
- Country: United States
- Language: English

Pig is a 2010 horror film directed by Adam Mason starring Molly Black, Guy Burnet and Andrew Howard.

== Plot ==
A deranged man finds one of his escaped victims, where he recaptures her and murders her. He brings the remains back to his junk-filled camp in the desert. Another woman (played by Lorry O'Toole) is seen chained up and abused. Andrew Howard's character urinates, abuses, and brings this character to his self-named “Rape Pen”.

A mentally handicapped woman (played by Molly Black) is referred to as "Baby." She is pregnant, with what is assumed to be Andrew Howard's baby, and is kept locked in a cage. His third victim, played by Guy Burnett, is also chained until he is released and used by Molly Black and Andrew Howard for target practice.

The pair then perform abhorrent acts upon his dead body with Andrew saying, "I've never stuck a screwdriver up someone's ass before." The dead woman from earlier (Lorry O'Toole) is seen gutted, and her liver is cooked over a fire.

The film ends with Andrew Howard wearing a suit and leaving on a plane for a supposed job in Hollywood.

== Production ==
Pig was made with a budget of $3,000. The entire 80 minutes of the movie are shot in one continuous shot that follows the main character, played by Andrew Howard, as he tortures and kills.

Since no script was written, the entire film was also improvised. The four credited producers for the movie are Adam Mason, Andrew Howard, Patrick Ewald, and Michael J. Sarna.

The film was also never meant to be sold. It has been streamed on platforms like SXSW and Bloody Disgusting, with only a few copies of the film being sold.

== Reception ==
With the brutal nature and raw camera, this movie was never meant to be commercial-friendly. Reviews for Pig include: "One of the single most grueling movie watching experiences you are ever likely to have," wrote Steve Barton from DREAD CENTRAL. "Howard's performance is mesmerizing. Proceed with caution. You have been warned," a writer from horrornews.net wrote. Twtitchfilm.net calls it "Gory. Sadistic. Unflinching."

== Cast ==
- Molly Black
- Guy Burnet
- Andrew Howard
- Lorry O'Toole
- Juliet Quintin-Archard
