= Strigoi (film) =

- Teaser poster
- Directed by: Faye Jackson
- Written by: Faye Jackson
- Produced by: Rey Muraru
- Starring: Cătălin Paraschiv
- Cinematography: Kathinka Minthe
- Edited by: Faye Jackson
- Production company: St. Moritz Productions
- Release date: 17 August 2009 (Toronto After Dark Film Festival)
- Running time: 105 minutes
- Country: United Kingdom
- Language: English

Strigoi is a 2009 British comedy horror film directed by Faye Jackson and starring Constantin Bărbulescu, Camelia Maxim, and Rudi Rosenfeld. Based on Romanian mythology, the film involves Romanian vampires, which are referred to as "strigoi".

== Premise ==
After failing to establish himself abroad as a doctor, Vlad returns home to Romania, where he becomes convinced that his village is subject to vampire attacks.

== Cast ==
- Constantin Bărbulescu as Constantin Tirescu
- Adrian Donea as Mara's Husband
- Zane Jarcu as Stefan (The Mayor)
- Vlad Jipa as Octav (The Policeman)
- Camelia Maxim as Mara Tomsa
- Cătălin Paraschiv as Vlad Cozma
- Dan Popa as Tudor (The Priest)
- Rudi Rosenfeld as Nicolae Cozma (Vlad's Grandfather)

== Release ==
Strigoi debuted on 17 August 2009 at the Toronto After Dark Film Festival and opened in other film festivals on the dates given below.

Region	Release date	Festival
Canada	17 August 2009	Toronto After Dark Film Festival
United States	20 September 2009	Maelstrom International Fantastic Film Festival
United States	24 September 2009	Idaho International Film Festival
Canada	28 September 2009	Edmonton International Film Festival
United States	10 October 2009	Eerie Horror Film Festival
United States	25 October 2009	Austin Film Festival
Australia	30 October 2009	Fantastic Planet Film Festival
South Africa	1 November 2009	South African Horrorfest
Greece	5 March 2010	International Sci-Fi & Fantasy Film Festival
Switzerland	5 July 2010	Neuchâtel International Fantastic Film Festival
United States	14 July 2010	Another Hole in the Head

== Reception ==
Dennis Harvey of Variety called it "often drolly funny if a tad long-winded ... a witty and unpredictable upending of genre tropes". Bloody Disgusting rated it 3.5/5 stars and wrote, "While the overall relaxed tone sometimes slows the pace, satire and dramatic moments fill any voids." Kurt Halfyard of Twitch Film, in comparing it to contemporary vampire films, wrote that it is more akin to an art-house film that eschews shallow exploitation in favor of occasionally gory metaphor about Romania's history.

== Accolades ==
Strigoi earned various awards in categories ranging from recognition of the film itself to its screenplay, direction and editing, to the performance of the lead actors.

Year	Festival	Award	Recipients
2010	Neuchâtel International Fantastic Film Festival	Best European Feature Film (Silver Méliès)	Faye Jackson
2009	Fantastic Planet Film Festival	Best Director	Faye Jackson
2009	Maelstrom International Fantastic Film Festival	Best Feature	Faye Jackson
2009	South African HORRORFEST	Best Picture	Faye Jackson
2009	Toronto After Dark Film Festival	Best Independent Feature Film (Gold Vision Award)	Faye Jackson
