= Andrew Howard =

Welsh actor

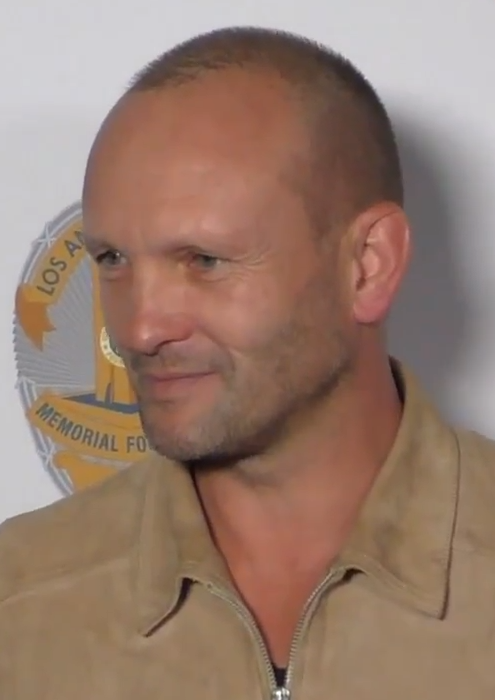
- Howard in 2016
- Born: 12 June 1969 (age 57); Cardiff, Wales
- Occupation: Actor
- Years active: 1994–present
- Children: 1

Andrew Howard (born 12 June 1969) is a Welsh theatre, television and film actor.

== Early life ==
Andrew grew up in Canton and Ely districts of Cardiff.

== Training ==
Howard trained at Cygnet Training Theatre in Exeter in the late 1980s, touring in productions of A Christmas Carol, Twelfth Night, Beggar's Opera and Peer Gynt among others.

== Career ==
=== Stage ===
On stage roles included Alex DeLarge in A Clockwork Orange, Peer Gynt in Peer Gynt, Orestes in Electra at theatres, including The Royal National Theatre (London) and The Donmar Warehouse (London).

=== Film ===
Howard has made notable appearances in several major productions, including the HBO miniseries Band of Brothers and the Guy Ritchie caper Revolver, as well as costarring alongside Patrick Stewart and Glenn Close in the 2003 TV film The Lion in Winter. He played "Bad" Frank Phillips in History Channel's Hatfields & McCoys.

In 2001, Howard was awarded best actor at the Tokyo International Film Festival for his portrayal of Jon in Mr In-Between. He co-wrote the screenplay for Shooters, a 2002 British crime drama in which he also starred. In 2009, he played Thomas Luster in the thriller film Luster under the direction from Adam Mason.

In 2009, he was also in the film Blood River, for which Howard won Best Actor Award at the Honolulu Film Festival and the Jack Nance Breakthrough Performance Award at the New York Film Festival Downtown. In 2011, he starred in Limitless, a film by Neil Burger originally titled The Dark Fields.

In 2014, he played a supporting role as the lead Russian henchman, Maxim, in Taken 3. Since 2015, he has appeared in the television series Bates Motel as Will Decody, who was originally portrayed by actor Ian Hart in the first season.

In 2020, he played the Driver in Tenet. In the same year, he starred as Officer Merk, a racist NYPD officer, in the Oscar-winning short film Two Distant Strangers.

== Filmography ==
=== Film ===
Year	Film	Role	Notes
1999	The Cherry Orchard	Trofimov	
1999	Shades	Dylan Cole	
2000	Rancid Aluminium	Trevor	
2001	Mr In-Between	Jon	
2002	Shooters	J	
2002	Moonlight	Gang Leader	
2002	Below	Hoag	
2003	The Lion in Winter	Richard the Lionheart	
2004	One Perfect Day	Hector Lee	
2005	Heights	Ian	
2005	The Last Drop	Captain Edward Banks	
2005	Revolver	Billy	
2006	The Devil's Chair	Nick West	
2007	Cassandra's Dream	Jerry	
2008	Love Me Still	Mickey Ronson	
2009	Luster	Thomas Luster	
2009	Blood River	Joseph	
2010	Pig	Daddy	
2010	I Spit on Your Grave	Sheriff Storch	
2011	Limitless	Gennady	
2011	The Hangover Part II	Nikolai	
2013	Monika	Eli	
2014	Taken 3	Maxim	
2014	Squatters	Ronald	
2016	True Memoirs of an International Assassin	Anton Masovich	
2016	Crow	Harley	
2017	CHiPs	Arnaud	
2018	Truth or Dare	Randall Himoff	
2019	Anna	Oleg	
2020	Tenet	The Driver	
2020	Songbird	Q-Zone Escapee	
2020	Two Distant Strangers	Officer Merk	Short film
2023	Mudbrick	Jakov	
2024	Hard Home	Diablo Killer	
2025	The Accountant 2	Batu	
2026	Truly Naked	Dylan	
2026	Man of War	Dany	
2026	The Odyssey	Polites	

=== Television ===
Year	Title	Role	Notes
2001	Band of Brothers	Captain Clarence Hester	2 episodes
2007	Suspect	Stella	TV movie
2011	Law & Order: Special Victims Unit	Luke Ronson	Episode: "Smoked"
2011	CSI	Johannes Desmoot	Episode: "A Kiss Before Frying"
2011	Burn Notice	Tavian Khorza	3 episodes
2012	Hatfields & McCoys	Frank 'Bad Frank' Phillips	TV miniseries
2012–2013	NCIS: Los Angeles	Dmitri Greshnev	2 episodes
2013	Copper	Mr. O'Rourke	3 episodes
2013	Boardwalk Empire	August Tucker	Episode: "Acres of Diamonds"
2013	Ironside	Ricky Tybor	Episode: "Hell on Wheels"
2014	Elementary	Devin Gasper	Episode: "The Diabolical Kind"
2014	The After	McCormick	TV movie
2014	Banshee	Quentin	Episode: "Armies of One"
2014	The Blacklist	Milo	Episode: "Berlin (No. 8): Conclusion"
2014–2015	Hell on Wheels	Dandy Johnny Shea	7 episodes
2015	The Lizzie Borden Chronicles	Billy Borden	2 episodes
2015	Proof	Randall Mason	Episode: "Redemption"
2015	Agents of S.H.I.E.L.D.	Luther Banks	Recurring role, 6 episodes
2015	Agent X	Nicolas Volker / Raymond Marks	Recurring role, 8 episodes
2015–2016	Bates Motel	Will Decody	Recurring role, 8 episodes
2017	24: Legacy	Gabriel	Episode: "4:00 p.m.-5:00 p.m."
2017	The Brave	Ranier Boothe	Episode: "The Greater Good"
2018–2019	The Outpost	Marshal Withers	Main role
2019	The Oath	Kraley	5 episodes
2019	Watchmen	Red Scare	Miniseries
2020	Perry Mason	Detective Ennis	Miniseries
2021	Mayor of Kingstown	Duke	5 episodes
2024	Echo	Zane	3 episodes
2026	Steal	Sniper / Morgan Trahern	6 episodes

=== Music ===
2016 Appearance in Against Me! Music Video 333.

=== Screenwriter ===
- 2002 Shooters film
- 2010 Pig film
