= Blood River (2009 film) =

- Directed by: Adam Mason
- Written by: Adam Mason; Simon Boyes
- Produced by: Timothy Patrick Cavanaugh; Mary Church; Patrick Ewald; Lee Librado; Adam Mason
- Cinematography: Stuart Brereton
- Edited by: Adam Mason
- Production company: Epic Pictures Group
- Release date: April 17, 2009 (Atlanta Film and Video Festival)
- Running time: 104 minutes
- Country: United States
- Language: English

Blood River is a 2009 psychological thriller film directed by Adam Mason and written by Simon Boyes and Adam Mason. It follows a newlywed couple's relationship during a chance encounter with a mysterious drifter in a deserted ghost town.

== Plot ==
Clark and Summer, a young married couple, are on their way to see Summer's parents. Their car has a blowout and, as they do not have a spare tire, the couple decides to walk onwards and find help. Upon arriving at a small collection of buildings, they realise that the town is abandoned. It isn't long before a drifter in a cowboy hat comes along. The stranger introduces himself as Joseph, and immediately overshadows Clark with his personality and style. That evening, around a campfire, the three talk: Summer shows Joseph a photo of her older son, Ben, who is Clark's stepson, while Joseph talks about how unlike Clark - who is a slave to society — he is himself, being beholden to no one but God.

The next morning, Joseph suggests that he and Clark walk back to the couple's car and siphon off the gas, then continue on to Joseph's truck and leave the area. Summer wants to accompany them, but Joseph and Clark both say that in her delicate condition, she should remain. Joseph pulls out a revolver and teaches Summer how to use it, touching her in an intimate way. Clark is obviously furious, but he and Joseph still set off together. On the way, Joseph continually mocks Clark for his weaknesses, claiming to know everything about him. Clark is convinced that Joseph is a fanatical, religious hippie. When they arrive, Joseph tells Clark that everything he is about to go through is his own fault, because of his sins, then disappears. Clark opens the trunk of his car to find Ben's rotting body, buzzing with flies. He is horrified, then realises that he has left Summer alone and rushes back.

Meanwhile, Summer has found a room in one of the abandoned buildings with photographs on the wall, including her photo of Ben, with a cross scratched over his face. She turns to find that Joseph is in the room with her. She attempts to shoot him, but the gun he gave her is unloaded. Joseph subdues her and uses a razor to carve a cross into her forehead, saying that she will have the mark forever and will remember what happened there. She begs to know why he is doing this and he claims that it is God's will. At that moment, Clark arrives and attacks Joseph, beating him to the ground.

When Joseph regains consciousness, he is tied to a chair. Clark demands to know how they can escape the town, but Joseph won't say. Clark takes a pair of pliers and cuts off one of Joseph's fingers in order to make him talk. Finally Joseph admits that he is an avenging angel, sent to punish the wicked for their sins. He suggests that Clark tell Summer what was in the trunk of their car but Clark says it was nothing. Joseph then agrees to help them as long as he can first show them something down by the river. Just past the water tower, there is a field of rough, wooden crosses, marking graves. Summer asks if Joseph killed all those people but he claims that he never killed anyone; all did it to themselves and every one of them deserved it.

Further into the makeshift graveyard, there are three empty graves. Joseph again exhorts Clark to tell Summer what his sin is. When Clark refuses, Joseph loads the gun and hands it to Summer, reiterating that she need only cock it and squeeze the trigger. Receiving no response to Joseph's repeated question, Summer assumes it has something to do with Ben and finally shoots Clark. When she asks what she has done to deserve this pain, Joseph tells her that her sin is apathy: she knew something was wrong but did nothing about it.

Joseph raises his hand to the sky and murmurs a prayer, and his finger reappears. His face is no longer wounded and bloody. Leaving Summer at the graveyard with the gun, he walks off. Summer attempts to shoot herself, but there had been only one bullet in the chamber.

== Cast ==
- Dillon Borowski as Benny
- Ian Duncan as Clark
- Sarah Essex as Inn Keeper
- Andrew Howard as Joseph
- Tess Panzer as Summer

== Release ==
Blood River debuted on 17 April 2009 at the Atlanta Film and Video Festival and opened in other film festivals on the dates given below.

Region	Release date	Festival
United States	April 17, 2009	Atlanta Film and Video Festival
United Kingdom	April 30, 2009	Dead by Dawn
United States	June 19, 2009	Visionfest
Canada	July 16, 2009	Fantasia Festival
United States	September 17, 2010	Maelstrom International Fantastic Film Festival
Spain	October 7, 2010	Sitges International Fantastic Film Festival

=== Home release ===
Blood River was released for online viewing or download and on DVD on 19 July 2010.
