= Promethea =

Comic book series

- Promethea Volume 1 TPB, copyright DC Comics

Publication information
- Publisher: America's Best Comics
- Format: Ongoing series
- Publication date: August 1999 – April 2005
- No. of issues: 32
- Main character(s): Sophie Bangs; Promethea

Creative team
- Written by: Alan Moore
- Artist(s): J. H. Williams III; Mick Gray
- Letterer: Todd Klein

Collected editions
- Volume 1 HC: ISBN 1-56389-655-9

Promethea is a comic book series created by Alan Moore, J. H. Williams III and Mick Gray, published by America's Best Comics/WildStorm.

It tells the story of Sophie Bangs, a college student from an alternate futuristic New York City in 1999, who embodies the powerful entity known as Promethea whose task it is to bring the Apocalypse.

Originally published as 32 issues from 1999 to 2005, the series has been re-published into five graphic novels and one hard-back issue. Moore weaves in elements of magic and mysticism along with superhero mythology and action, spirituality and the afterlife (in particular the Tree of Life) and science fiction. Promethea includes wide-ranging experimentation with visual styles and art.

== Plot summary ==
In the 5th century AD, a Christian mob threatens the home of a magician in Hellenistic Egypt. He tells his daughter Promethea to flee into the desert, hoping the gods of the ancient world will preserve her. The story shifts to New York City in the late 20th century. Sophie Bangs is hoping to interview a woman named Barbara Shelley for a college paper on "Promethea", a character who seems to recur in literature and pop culture through the centuries. Shelley is hostile to her and warns: "You don't wanna go looking for folklore. And you especially don't want folklore to come looking for you". After departing, Sophie is tracked and attacked by a creature known as a Smee. Just as things look bleakest for Sophie, she is rescued by Barbara, who has mystical powers and is now dressed as Promethea. She informs Sophie that the only reason she would be attacked is if someone suspects she will become the next vessel for Promethea (Barbara is the current). It turns out that Promethea is called to the world when someone uses their imagination to make her real. As they hide from the pursuing Smee, the weakened and fatally injured Barbara instructs Sophie to write a poem about Promethea hoping Sophie is indeed the successor and the creative expression is a way to get Sophie in the correct state of mind to allow herself to become Promethea. Barbara's idea works and from that night Sophie, having defeated the Smee, becomes the next Promethea.

The story continues with Sophie/Promethea learning about Promethea and the previous individuals who have in the past been the vessels for Promethea. In the days that follow, the hospital where Barbara lies is attacked by demons, an act that leads to Barbara's death. This motivates Sophie to learn more about magic, mysticism and the Tree of Life and its spheres in order to find Barbara and help her seek Steve Shelly, Barbara's dead husband. Throughout their climb up the spheres of Tree of Life Sophie/Promethea and Barbara encounter difficulties such as imprisonment by the demon Asmodeus, as well as meeting figures such as Sophie's father Juan (who died when she was little), Barbara's guardian angel Boo-Boo and Promethea's father, who she has not seen since his murder in 411 A.D. Eventually Barbara and Steve find each other and are reincarnated as twins (who Sophie ends up looking after at the end of the book). Having been gone a whole summer, Sophie is unaware the FBI has been tracking Promethea, and want to take her into custody for the events Promethea has caused throughout the years. Moments before the FBI arrives, Sophie's mother instructs her to run away (just as Promethea's father had centuries earlier).

Three years pass and Sophie, having abandoned her duties as Promethea, hides in Millennium City under the alias Joey Estrada with new boyfriend Carl. After being found by the FBI and Tom Strong, however, Sophie reluctantly becomes Promethea and in turn carries out one final task: bringing about the end of the world.

== Themes ==
Moore has himself said that the series is didactic in its philosophical messaging: "There are 1000 comic books on the shelves that don't contain a philosophy lecture and one that does. Isn't there room for that one?"

The title Promethea implies the feminine version of the mythological Prometheus. In making his lead character an aspiring poet whose words conjure the malleable form of a literary goddess—as well as the non-linear narratives and references to literary theory and alternative philosophies—Moore's themes are aligned with the countercultural theory and politics of écriture féminine.

Subjects dealt with in this series include the occult, the tarot and Hermetic Qabalah. The comic is laden with mythological mystical symbolism, drawing in many religious and cultural references. Real people who appear in Promethea include Aleister Crowley, John Dee, Austin Osman Spare, and John Kendrick Bangs (who in the comic is distantly related to Sophie Bangs).

== In other comics ==
In January 2018, DC Comics, the owner of the America's Best Comics / WildStorm imprint, introduced Promethea into its mainstream continuity by way of the comic Justice League of America #24. The controversial storyline involved Promethea assisting various superheroes in fighting a villain called the Queen of Fables. Artist J. H. Williams III was reported as having no prior knowledge of the introduction of the character into DC Comics' broader continuity, and is quoted as saying: "I can't in good conscience condone this happening in any form at all".

== Main characters ==
=== Promethea ===
Promethea is a young girl whose father is killed by a Christian mob in Alexandria in 411 AD. After escaping the mob, alone in the desert she is taken in hand by the god Thoth-Hermes, who tells her that if she goes with him/them into the Immateria, a plane of existence home to the imagination, she will no longer be just a little girl but a story living eternally. "Promethea" thereafter manifests through a series of individuals or vessels who have channeled her energy through the power of imagination.

Since the incident with the little girl in Alexandria, there have been eight known Promethea vessels. Six are characters in the story, the other two are told as two individuals, one Christian and one Muslim, who live during the Crusades and fight each other. As there should only ever be one active Promethea at any one moment in history, the fight causes Promethea great pain, something that is repeated when Stacia/Grace fights Sophie/Promethea. It could be argued that there is a ninth Promethea vessel – Stacia Vanderveer, but Stacia is only a vessel for Grace Brannagh, a dead woman who once herself was Promethea and not the original little girl.

=== Sophie Bangs/Joey Estrada ===
The protagonist of the series, Sophie becomes Promethea after tracing the character's history in literature for a college paper. Her personality as Sophie is initially somewhat timid; by the end of the book she becomes an adept magician and confident young woman. She is the most powerful Promethea to date, and the only one not to have been killed during her time as Promethea. She changes her name to Joey after running away to Millennium City to escape the FBI and her duties as Promethea.

=== Barbara Shelley/Boo-Boo Ramirez ===
The wife of comic book writer Steven Shelley, Barbara became Promethea when her husband began projecting Barbara's characteristics onto the Promethea character in his comics. During her passage in the afterlife, Barbara meets her guardian angel Boo-Boo (Barbara's old nickname) who is in fact the younger, beautiful and independent young woman she used to be. By the time she finds her husband, she and Boo-Boo become one person.

=== Stacia Vanderveer ===
Sophie's best friend, Stacia is an extremely cynical and sarcastic college student. During an attack at the hospital she was visiting Sophie in, Sophie uses Stacia as a vessel for Grace Brannagh to help the fight. While Sophie journeyed to find Barbara in the afterlife, Stacia/Grace were re-instated to temporarily serve as acting Promethea, leading Stacia and Grace to fall in love. After Sophie's return, Stacia and Grace refused to relinquish the Promethea title, but were forced to by a court hearing in the Immateria. After the Apocalypse, Stacia and former FBI Agent Ball become lovers, while Stacia still has sexual liaisons with Grace in the Immateria.

=== Grace Brannagh ===
An illustrator who created a series of covers for pulp magazine fantasy stories about Promethea, which were written by several writers under the pseudonym "Marto Neptura", Brannagh was the most proficient fighter of all the Prometheas. She held the Promethea mantle from 1920 to 1939. In a text article in Promethea #1, Brannagh's style is compared to that of Weird Tales illustrator Margaret Brundage.

=== Jack Faust ===
Jack Faust is a magician who first approaches Sophie in order to confuse her during her first days as Promethea. Jack is first seen as a handsome young man, but is actually revealed to be older, balding and overweight. Jack promises to teach Sophie magic if she (in her Promethea form) agrees to have sex with him. At first Sophie declines, but later agrees, knowing this knowledge will help her travel in the afterlife and help Barbara.

== Recurring characters ==
=== William "Bill" Woolcott ===
The only man to assume the role of Promethea, Bill Woolcott was a gay comic artist who became Promethea by drawing her. He was the longest-lasting Promethea, from 1939 to 1969, and acted as a "science-hero" in the ABC universe with Tom Strong during that period. Bill/Promethea most resembles a 1960s version of Wonder Woman. Bill was shot in the head by Promethea's lover, FBI Agent Dennis Drucker, who reacted violently when he discovered that his lover was (in a manner of speaking) transgender. Drucker spent several decades in an insane asylum tortured by guilt for having killed Promethea, while Bill/Promethea spent similar time in the Immateria blaming herself for not having told him the truth. The two are reunited during the Apocalypse.

=== Anna ===
The poet Charlton Sennet, in the 1770s, projected Promethea's likeness onto his housemaid Anna, transforming her into his dream lover. This Promethea bore him a child, but the baby evaporated on birth, since in a sense it was only "half-real", an amalgamation of the physical nature of Charlton Sennet and the metaphysical nature of Promethea. Anna died in childbirth, leaving Charlton alone (his wife deserted him after finding him in bed with Anna/Promethea).

=== Margaret Taylor Case ===
The writer of a William Randolph Hearst-syndicated comic strip titled Little Margie in Misty Magic Land, Case wrote Promethea into her comic book as a helpful spirit to the titular young adventurer, and ended up personifying Promethea to help soldiers on the battlefield from 1900 to 1920, in a manner similar to the legendary Angels of Mons. Little Margie also dwells in the Immateria alongside Case and the other past Prometheas, where she is regarded as little more than a pest who interrupts "serious" conversation with her childlike observations, styled after the remarks of the character Nemo in the early 20th-century newspaper strip Little Nemo in Slumberland. Margaret committed suicide during her tenure as Promethea.

=== Five Swell Guys ===
The Five Swell Guys are a team of "science-heroes", and the only such team in New York City. There is similarity between them and Fantastic Four, with their floating platform and their specialized members. The team meet Sophie Bangs in the first issue, and then meet Promethea in the third issue, after one is badly hurt.

=== Weeping Gorilla Comix ===
The Weeping Gorilla from Promethea #1

The "Weeping Gorilla Comix" is a series of one-panel comics featuring a weeping gorilla, with a thought bubble pronouncing some thoughtful phrase, usually cynical and self-pitying in nature: "Why do good things happen to bad people?", "Who remaindered the book of Love?", "She gets the kids and the house. I get the car", etc. The whole concept is an industry joke about the supposed tendency for comics to get increased sales from a picture of a gorilla, a weeping character, or the color purple on the cover. Occasionally Moore shows snippets of the gorilla's foil, the Chucklin' Duck, who is happy-go-lucky and naively optimistic, with smug saying such as "Heh heh! I got out of internet trading just in time!". Both the Weeping Gorilla and Chucklin' Duck motifs were used in the Greyshirt: Indigo Sunset series by Rick Veitch, and a Weeping Gorilla Comix panel makes a cameo appearance in the story "King Solomon Pines" in Tom Strong's Terrific Tales #5 (scripted by Leah Moore and illustrated by Sergio Aragones). The Tesla Strong miniseries included, amongst various versions of Solomon, one who resembled the Weeping Gorilla.

== Collected editions ==
The trade paperbacks for Promethea were first released in hardcover:

- Promethea Book 1, issues #1-6
  - Hardcover: ISBN 1-56389-655-9
  - Paperback: ISBN 1-56389-667-2
- Promethea Book 2, issues #7-12
  - Hardcover: ISBN 1-56389-784-9
  - Paperback: ISBN 1-56389-957-4
- Promethea Book 3, issues #13-18
  - Hardcover: ISBN 1-84023-550-0
  - Paperback: ISBN 1-4012-0094-X
- Promethea Book 4, issues #19-25
  - Hardcover: ISBN 1-4012-0032-X
  - Paperback: ISBN 1-4012-0031-1
- Promethea Book 5, issues #26-32
  - Hardcover: ISBN 1-4012-0619-0
  - Paperback: ISBN 1-4012-0620-4

An Absolute Edition was released from 2009 to 2011:

- Absolute Promethea Book 1, issues #1–12, October 2009
  - Hardcover: ISBN 978-1-4012-2372-4
- Absolute Promethea Book 2, issues #13–23, October 2010
  - Hardcover: ISBN 978-1-4012-2842-2
- Absolute Promethea Book 3, issues #24–32, December 2011
  - Hardcover: ISBN 978-1-4012-2947-4

A 20th anniversary Deluxe Edition was released from 2019 to 2020:

- Promethea: The 20th Anniversary Deluxe Edition Book One, issues #1–12, March 12, 2019
  - Hardcover: ISBN 978-1-4012-8866-2
- Promethea: The 20th Anniversary Deluxe Edition Book Two, issues #13–23, March 31, 2019
  - Hardcover: ISBN 978-1-4012-9545-5
- Promethea: The 20th Anniversary Deluxe Edition Book Three, issues #24–32, December 22, 2020
  - Hardcover: ISBN 978-1-7795-0226-1
