= Ellen Rogers =

English photographer and visual artist

- Born: 1983 (age 42–43)
- Education: Goldsmiths, University of London
- Known for: Photography

Ellen Rogers is an English photographer and visual artist. She uses film photography darkroom processes and development techniques. Rogers is best known for her work in fashion photography and portraiture.

Born in Norfolk in 1983, Rogers developed an interest in photography at a young age, assisting her father with his own photographic work, and gaining an early appreciation for film and the collecting of film cameras. She studied at Goldsmiths' College London, where she received a Master's in Photography.

Working with designers like Alice Temperley, her photographs have been used in look-books and supporting fashion campaigns, as well as magazines such as Vice, Vogue Italia, The British Journal of Photography, Dazed & Confused, the Guardian, and more. She is a contributor at Lomography magazine, where she has written articles on the subject of analogue and experimental photography. Her photography has been used in advertising campaigns for the Ashmolean Museum of Art and Archaeology.
