= Shooters (2000 film) =

2002 film directed by Colin Teague

- DVD cover
- Directed by: Colin Teague; Glenn Durfort
- Written by: Gary Young; Andrew Howard; Louis Dempsey
- Produced by: Margery Bone
- Starring: Adrian Dunbar; Andrew Howard; Louis Dempsey; Gerard Butler; Ioan Gruffudd; Jamie Sweeney; Melanie Lynskey
- Narrated by: Louis Dempsey
- Cinematography: Tom Erisman
- Edited by: Kevin Whelan
- Music by: Kemal Ultanur
- Distributed by: Media Cooperation One (MC-One)
- Release dates: 21 February 2000 (AFM); 25 January 2002 (UK)
- Running time: 95 minutes
- Countries: United Kingdom; United States; Netherlands
- Language: English
- Budget: £1.3 million

Shooters is a 2002 British crime drama film. Directed by Colin Teague and Glenn Durfort, it was filmed in London in 1999 and released theatrically in the UK on 25 January 2002. In addition to co-writing the screenplay, Andrew Howard and Louis Dempsey play the lead characters. Adrian Dunbar, Gerard Butler, Ioan Gruffudd, and Melanie Lynskey co-star.

== Synopsis ==
After six long years behind bars, Gilly wants to settle down and live a quiet life. But it is not to be. Within hours of freedom, he discovers that his best friend and perennial partner in crime, "J", has invested all their cash in a huge array of submachine guns, dragging an apprehensive Gilly straight back into a lawless existence. As things intensify, J's pledge to his friend that this will be their last-ever job starts to feel more and more dubious.

== Cast ==
- Adrian Dunbar as Max Bell
- Andrew Howard as "J"/Justin
- Louis Dempsey as Gilly
- Gerard Butler as Jackie Junior
- Jason Hughes as Charlie Franklin
- Matthew Rhys as Eddie
- Ioan Gruffudd as Freddy Guns
- Jamie Sweeney as Skip
- Melanie Lynskey as Marie
- Emma Fielding as DI Sarah Pryce
- David Kennedy as DS Dave Webb
- Joe Swash as Boy #1
- Ranjit Krishnamma as Pac
- Nitin Ganatra as Ajay
- Walter Roberts as Jason
- Ted Nygh as Mickey
- Mike Martin as Vic
- Glenn Durfort as Glenn
- Treva Etienne as Benny
- Raquel Cassidy as Tess
- Stephen Evans as Pal
- Tucker Stevens as Bodyguard 1
- Ali Wilson as Bodyguard 2
- Adam Deacon as Drug Runner (uncredited)

== Release and reception ==
Shooters was released theatrically in the UK on 25 January 2002. The film received a mixed reception, with critics pointing out its overreliance on gangster film clichés. In a more positive appraisal, Empire commended its gritty realism, calling it "refreshing [and] authentic".
