= Wild Girl (comics) =

Cover of the first issue

Wild Girl is a six issue comic book limited series published in late 2004 and early 2005 by Wildstorm Productions, an imprint of DC Comics. It was written by Leah Moore and John Reppion, with art by Shawn McManus. Notably, it was released under the WildStorm Universe banner, but has no ties to any other WildStorm properties.

== Plot ==
The series focuses on Rosa, a young girl. She lives with her mother and a younger brother. After a violent incident with a bird crashing through her window she begins to have distressing visions. She ultimately runs away from home.

She meets a seemingly kindly old man, who has dark secrets of his own. After escaping him, she injures her head jumping a barbed wire fence and discovers the ability to talk to animals.
