= John Reppion =

English comics writer

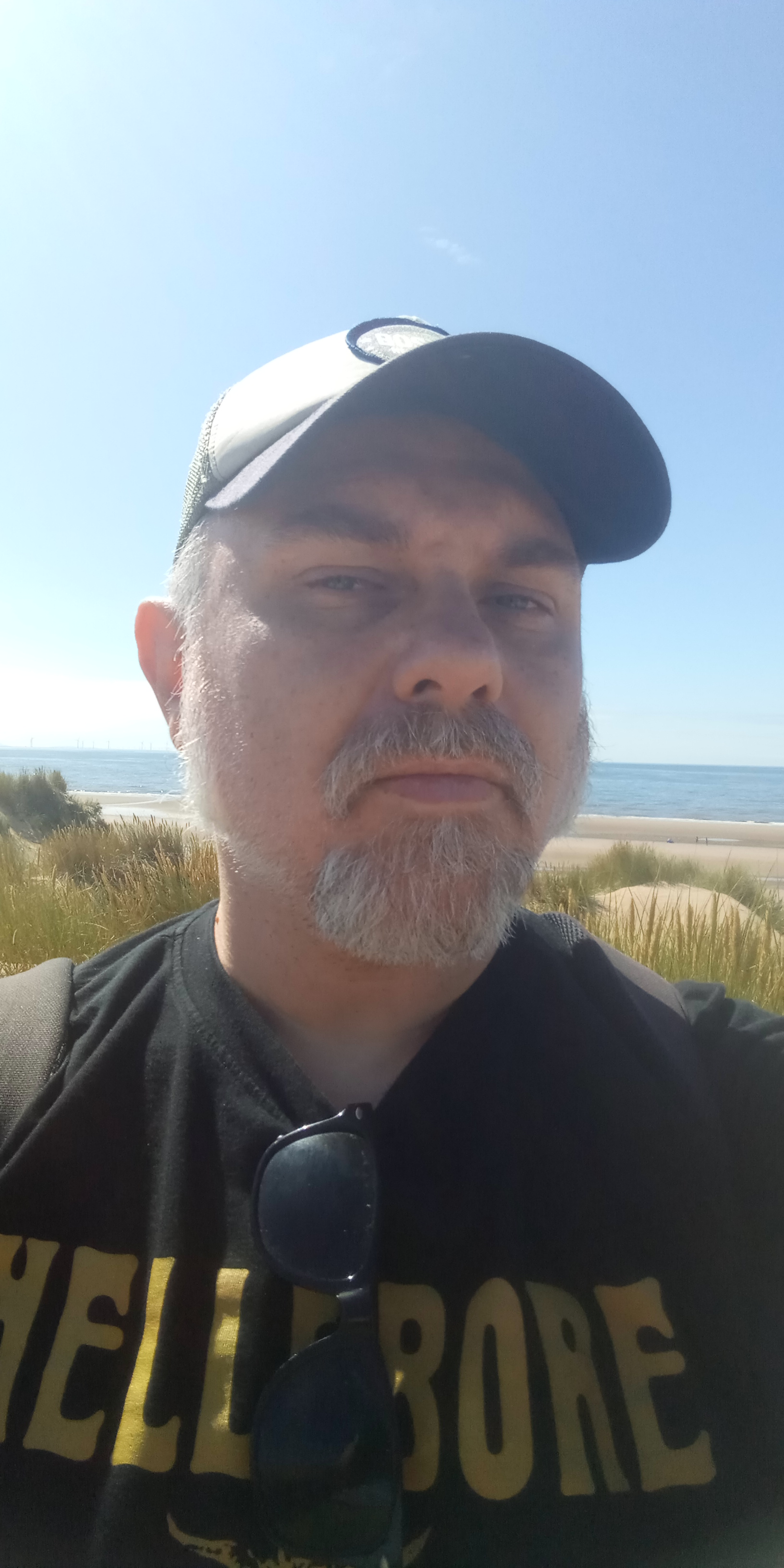
- John Reppion, August 2023
- Born: 11 November 1978 (age 48) Liverpool, England
- Area: Writer
- Notable works: Albion, Spirits of Place

John Mark Reppion (born 1978) is an English comics writer. He is married to Leah Moore, the daughter of Alan Moore, and he has worked with both on the comic Albion.

John Reppion and Leah Moore have co-writing credits on Wild Girl, a 6-part comic for Wildstorm with art by Shawn McManus and J.H. Williams III. Since 2003 the majority of his comics work has been co-written with Leah, as Moore & Reppion. Together they have scripted comics and graphic novels for the likes of 2000 AD, Penguin Books, Channel 4 Education, Dark Horse, DC Comics, Dynamite Entertainment, Electricomics, IDW, and Self Made Hero.

Moore & Reppion were consulting writers for some of the mysteries featured in Frogwares Games multi-platform adventure Sherlock Holmes: Crimes & Punishments, 2014.

In 2008 The History Press published 800 Years of Haunted Liverpool – John's weird history/paranormal guidebook to the city.

He has written articles for the likes of Fortean Times, the History UK website, the Crime + Investigation UK website, Dark lore, The Big Issue, SteamPunk Magazine, and Kerrang! magazine, is a frequent contributor to Hellebore (magazine) and is a contributing editor for The Daily Grail online.

His fiction has been published in anthologies from Combustion Books, Ghostwoods Books, PS Publishing, Snowbooks, Swan River Press, and Vagrants Among Ruins.

Reppion has collaborated with various musicians, artists, and record labels including Waxwork Records, Library of the Occult Records, Heimat Der Katastrophe, Dean Hurley, Megadeth, Def Leppard, and Iron Maiden.

== Bibliography ==
=== Comics ===
- Wild Girl (with co-author Leah Moore, and art by Shawn McManus and J.H. Williams III, Wildstorm, 2004)
- Albion (plotted by Alan Moore, with co-author Leah Moore, and art by Shane Oakley, Wildstorm, 2006, tpb, Wildstorm, 176 pages, December 2006, ISBN 1-4012-0994-7, Titan Books, 144 pages, January 2007, ISBN 1-84576-351-3)
- Accent Anthologies (with co-author Leah Moore):
  - "Lusca" (with David Hitchcock, in Monsters, 2006)
  - "An Molethy a an Ny-marrow (The Curse of the Un-dead)" (with David Hitchcock, in Zombies, 2007)
  - "The Cabinet of Doctor Diablo" (with Andy Bloor, in Robots, 2008)
  - "Mrs. Henry" (with David Hitchcock, Western, 2009)
- Witchblade: "Shades of Gray" (with co-author Leah Moore, and art by Stephen Segovia, Top Cow/Dynamite Entertainment, 2007)
- Raise the Dead (with co-author Leah Moore, and pencil by Hugo Petrus and inks by Marc Rueda, 4-issue mini-series, Dynamite Entertainment, 2007, tpb, 120 pages, February 2008, ISBN 1-933305-56-8)
- Savage Tales: "Battle for Atlantis" (with co-author Leah Moore, and art by Pablo Marcos, in Savage Tales #1–3, Dynamite Entertainment, 2007)
- Gene Simmons House of Horrors: "Into The Woods" (with co-author Leah Moore, and art by Jeff Zornow, IDW Publishing, 2007, tpb, 192 pages, April 2008, ISBN 1-60010-209-3)
- Space Doubles: "Project: Obeah" (with co-author Leah Moore, and art by Jeremy Dale and Jason Roth, Th3rd World Studios, 2007)
- Nevermore: "The Black Cat" (with co-author Leah Moore, and art by James Fletcher, Eye Classics, Self Made Hero, October 2007, ISBN 978-0-9552856-8-4)
- "Deadeye" (with co-author Leah Moore and art by Matt Timson, in Popgun No. 1, Popgun No. 2, Image Comics, 2007/2008)
- Darkness vs. Eva (with co-author Leah Moore and art by Edgar Salazar)
- Tori Amos - Comic Book Tattoo (with co-author Leah Moore), Image Comics, 2008.
- Doctor Who: "The Whispering Gallery" (with co-author Leah Moore and art by Ben Templesmith, one-shot, IDW Publishing)
- The Complete Dracula (with co-author Leah Moore and art by Colton Worley, 5-issue limited series, Dynamite Entertainment 2009)
- The Trial of Sherlock Holmes (with co-author Leah Moore, Dynamite Entertainment 2009).
- The Complete Alice In Wonderland (with co-author Leah Moore, Dynamite Entertainment 2010).
- The Thrill Electric with co-author Leah Moore and art by WindFlower Studio, October 2011.
- Sherlock Holmes – The Liverpool Demon (with co-author Leah Moore), Dynamite Entertainment, 2012.
- Black Shuck (with co-author Leah Moore), 2000 AD, 2014.
- Storm Warning - "The Relic" (with co-author Leah Moore), 2000 AD, 2015.
- Sway (with co-author Leah moore), Electricomics, 2015.
- Damsels (with co-author Leah Moore), Dynamite Entertainment, 2015.
- Ghost Stories of an Antiquary Vol 1 (with co-author Leah Moore), Self Made Hero, 2015.
- Ghost Stories of an Antiquary Vol 2 (with co-author Leah Moore), Self Made Hero, 2016.
- Damsels Vol 2 (with co-author Leah Moore), Dynamite Entertainment, 2016.
- Black Shuck - Sins of the Father (with co-author Leah Moore), 2000 AD, 2016.
- Storm Warning - "Over My Dead Body" (with co-author Leah Moore), 2000 AD 2018.
- Conspiracy of Ravens (with co-authors Leah Moore and Sally Jane Thompson), Dark Horse, 2018.
- Sherlock Holmes - The Vanishing Man (with co-author Leah Moore), Dynamite Entertainment, 2019.
- Storm Warning - "Green and Pleasant Land" (with co-author Leah Moore), 2000 AD 2019.
- Storm Warning - "Dead and Gone", 2000 AD, 2019.
- Megadeth - Death By Design (with co-author Leah Moore), Heavy Metal Magazine, 2019.
- Kyle Thomas - Guardian of the Realm (with co-author Leah Moore), Penguin Michael Joseph, 2022.
- Queens of the Lost World (with co-author Leah Moore and artist Silvia Califano), Opus Comics, 2023.
- Iron Maiden- Piece of Mind (with co-author Leah Moore), Z2, 2023.

=== Articles ===
- The Childe of Hale, Fortean Times No. 187, September 2004.
- "Suspension of Disbelief: The Great Yarmouth Bridge Disaster of 1845" (The Anomalist No. 13, 2007)
- Spring Heeled Jack Visits Liverpool, Fortean Times No. 238, June 2008.
- Lightning Tree Lore, Fortean Times No. 297, January 2013.
- Sighthill Stone Circle, Fortean Times No. 319, November 2014.
- Daily Grail articles 2014-present
- The Last Wolf in England, Fortean Times No. 375, January 2019.
- Bodies in the Bog, Hellebore (magazine) #1, 2019.
- The Wild Hunt, Hellebore (magazine) #2, 2020.
- Mothers Night, Hellebore (magazine) #4, 2020.
- The House of the Great Beast, Hellebore (magazine) #6, 2021.
- Seeing Faeries, Hellebore (magazine) #8, 2022.

=== Prose Fiction ===
- "On the Banks of the River Jordan", published in Cthulhu Lives!, Ghostwoods Books, 2014.
- "The Black Abbess", published in Black Wings of Cthulhu 5, PS Publishing/Titan Books, 2016.
- "Exeunt", published in Shakespeare Vs Cthulhu, Snow Books, 2016.
- "The Faerie Ring", published in Uncertainties Vol 1, Swan River Press, 2016.
- "Greenwood Green", published in Haunted Futures, Ghostwoods Books, 2017.
- "Church of the Second Sun" (novelette), published within the album sleeve of the LP of the same name by Antoni Maiovvi & ANTA, 2021
- "Hog Maiden", published alongside the album of the same name by Glog, 2022
- "Wolf" -Tales of the Library of the Occult #1, published alongside the album of the same name by Dream Division, read by Matthew Holness, 2022
- "Storm" -Tales of the Library of the Occult #2, published alongside the album of the same name by Klaus Morlock, read by Kathrine Peach, 2022
- "Crust" -Tales of the Library of the Occult #3, published alongside the album of the same name by Blood & Dust, read by Peter Baker, 2022
- "Flower" -Tales of the Library of the Occult #4, published alongside the album of the same name by Dean Hurley, read by Peter Baker, 2022
- "Honey" -Tales of the Library of the Occult #5, published alongside the album of the same name by Nolan Potter's Nightmare Band, read by Peter Baker, 2023
- "Faer - The Wanderer", published alongside the album of the same name by Gnoll, 2024 (forthcoming).

=== Books ===
- 800 Years of Haunted Liverpool (with illustrations by Mo Ali, Declan Shalvey and others), The History Press, 2008.
- SteamPunk Salmagundi (collected writings from SteamPunk Magazine 2007 - 2013), self-published, 2013.
- Spirits of Place (editor), Daily Grail Publishing, 2016.
- Sir Gawain and the Green Knight (graphic novel adaptation, illustrated by Mark Penman, self-published Penman/Reppion, 2021)
- The Hellebore Guide to Occult Britain (contributor), Hellebore (magazine), 2021.
- Fascinating Folklore with artist PJ Holden, Liminal 11, 2023.
