= The Presence (film) =

- Theatrical release poster
- Directed by: Tom Provost
- Written by: Tom Provost
- Produced by: Daniel Myrick; Tom Provost; Brandon Blake; Tom Rice
- Starring: Mira Sorvino; Justin Kirk; Tony Curran; Shane West
- Cinematography: Collin Brink
- Edited by: Cecily Rhett
- Music by: Conrad Pope
- Production companies: Khartoum; Saturn Harvest Films; Flatland Pictures
- Distributed by: Lionsgate
- Release date: August 2010 (Rhode Island Film Festival)
- Running time: 87 minutes
- Country: United States
- Language: English
- Budget: $1 million

The Presence is a 2010 American horror film written and directed by Tom Provost and starring Mira Sorvino, Shane West, and Justin Kirk. It is the directorial debut for Provost.

== Plot ==
A woman (Mira Sorvino) arrives at a cabin in an isolated forest on a small island inhabited by the apparition of a man (Shane West) whom she cannot see or hear, and who cannot leave the cabin. The Ghost, although undisturbed, is curious about her and starts watching her, something that she starts to perceive faintly.

After a few days, her boyfriend (Justin Kirk) joins her unannounced and, although surprised, she happily shows him around. She brings him to an elevated spot with a broad view of the area that she claims was a favourite of hers when she was a child. Her boyfriend suddenly proposes to her, and noticing that she is confused and full of doubt, bids her to keep the engagement ring and think about it. At that moment, he loses his balance and nearly falls off, as she rushes to pull him back to safety. The event changes her mind and she accepts his proposal; however, the ring seems to have been lost in the accident.

The same day, while the woman is busy with work and her boyfriend is cooking dinner, the Ghost perceives whispers and, watching her, notices another ghost dressed in black (Tony Curran) who sits very close to her and feeds her with ill words about her relationship, as she apparently cannot see him either but receives his words all the same. The Ghost in Black notices the other ghost and approaches him, proposing to aid him to escape his limited supernatural existence in exchange for his help. The first Ghost notices that the other one’s words affect her, turning her cold and hostile and causing her to snap at her boyfriend. Later that night, the Ghost notices the Ghost in Black sitting between the couple and talking to both in the same secret way, furthermore increasing the tension between them. The following day, the man seeks to discuss things with her, which angers her and makes her break off the engagement. This upsets him and he decides to leave, which she says he cannot do as they can only leave the island on a boat that only comes occasionally unless summoned. He attempts to call but finds out that the cell phone is dead.

Later, the man makes ready to leave, but before he can do so he tries to look for her, and discovers that she is missing. He goes outside and remembers an opening that she had shown him upon his arrival which leads to the space underneath the cabin, into which he crawls. The woman, arriving back herself after reflecting on things and finding the engagement ring, returns to the cabin hoping to mend things, and finds that he packed his things but cannot determine whether he has departed. She feels the presence of the ghost and questions him about her boyfriend, to which he answers by knocking loudly and informing her that her partner has not left. She crawls into the space underneath the cabin herself and finds him lying unconscious and injured. The Ghost in Black, after threatening the other Ghost for having helped her, reveals himself to her and urges her to smash her partner’s head with a rock, which she seems resolute to do, before she stops and defies the ghost. She goes back outside to call for help, but the Ghost in Black keeps standing in her way. Before he can harm her, she notices some other presence behind him; he then turns around and screams in terror while she escapes.

She retreats into the cabin, where the first Ghost is standing still unseen. He then screams, which makes her notice him and realise that he was never against her. The third presence (Deobia Oparei) enters the cabin; it is revealed in flashbacks that this third Ghost has benignly aided the couple, both saving the man from falling off and later placing the ring for her to find. He rescues the Ghost from his existence and both disappear. Mr. Browman (Muse Watson), a townsman, appears at the door and tells her that he came because he had a feeling that something was wrong and had tried unsuccessfully to communicate with her. They bring her boyfriend out from under the house and take him away on his boat so he can receive medical assistance. As they leave, another silent presence can be seen sitting next to Mr Browman.

== Cast ==
- Mira Sorvino as The Woman
- Shane West as Ghost
- Justin Kirk as The Man
- Tony Curran as The Man In Black
- Muse Watson as Mr. Browman
- Deobia Oparei as Woodsman

== Production ==
The film was shot in the Mount Hood National Forest in Oregon.
