= Shane Oakley =

British illustrator and comic book artist

- Area: Artist
- Notable works: Albion

Shane Oakley is a British illustrator and comic book artist from Stoke-on-Trent, England.

== Biography ==
Oakley began his career contributing to the alternative comics review Deadline Magazine in the 1980s, where he created Fatal Charm with D'Israeli. In 1989 Oakley worked as the penciller on issues 1 to 6 of Mister X volume two. Since then Oakley has contributed to several anthology titles, such as Negative Burn and The Big Book of Urban Legends, even drawing an issue of Neil Gaiman's legendary Sandman.

=== Albion ===
Oakley is probably best known for his co-creation of the Wildstorm mini series Albion, with Alan Moore, Leah Moore, and John Reppion which ran from 2005 until 2006. The series revived many long forgotten UK comic book characters such as the Steel Claw and Grimly Feendish, some of whom had not been in print since the 1950s.

=== Other work ===
Oakley worked as a concept artist for Frazer Lee's horror film Urbane.

In 2007 he illustrated an adaptation of Edgar Allan Poe's "The Fall of the House of Usher" written by Dan Whitehead and published in Self Made Hero's Nevermore anthology.

Boom! Studios' Cthulhu Tales #2 (published April 2008) featured a story entitled The Hiding Place written by Steve Niles and illustrated by Oakley.

Oakley provided covers for several issues of Cthulhu Tales and Zombie Tales. He also provided the art for Channel Evil, written by Alan Grant and co-published by Berserker Comics and Renegade Arts Entertainment.

== Bibliography ==
- Mister X Volume Two #1–6 (written by Jeffrey Morgan, Vortex Comics, 1989–1990)
- Rock & Roll High School #1–2 (written by Bob Fingerman with inks by Jason Lutes, Roger Corman's Cosmic Comics, 1995)
- Albion (plotted by Alan Moore, written by Leah Moore/John Reppion, Wildstorm, 2005–2006 tpb ISBN 1-4012-0994-7)
- Channel Evil (with Alan Grant, 4-issue mini-series, Berserker Comics/Renegade Arts Entertainment, 2009)
- "The Fall of the House of Usher" (with Dan Whitehead, in Nevermore, Self Made Hero, 2012 ISBN 0-9552856-8-2)
