= Leah Moore =

British comics writer and columnist

- Born: 4 February 1978 (age 48) Northampton, England
- Area: Writer
- Notable works: Albion; Wild Girl
- Spouse: John Reppion

Leah Moore (born 4 February 1978) is a British comic book writer and columnist. The daughter of comics writer Alan Moore, she frequently collaborates with her husband, writer John Reppion, as Moore & Reppion.

She is a Bachelor of Arts in Classics and English Literature, having graduated from Manchester University in 2001.

She was a tutor on the Arvon Foundation's Graphic Novel residential courses in 2014 and 2016.

== Biography ==
Moore was born to comics writer Alan Moore and Phyllis Moore on 4 February 1978 in Northampton. Her father is well known in the comics industry, and Leah Moore grew up familiar with it.

== Career ==
Moore began writing for comics with stories for America's Best Comics in 2002.

Together, Moore & Reppion have scripted comics and graphic novels for the likes of 2000 AD, Channel 4 Education, Dark Horse, DC Comics, Dynamite Entertainment, Electricomics, IDW, and Self Made Hero. Moore & Reppion were consulting writers for some of the mysteries featured in Frogwares Games multi platform adventure Sherlock Holmes - Crimes & Punishments, 2014. Moore was the Project Manager and a contributing editor for the digital comics publishing and reading platform Electricomics from 2013 to 2016.

Moore has written for Dynamite Entertainment (Gail Simone's Swords of Sorrow, Red Sonja), Heavy Metal, 2000 AD (Summer Special 2018), and Shelly Bond's Black Crown Publishing (Femme Magnifique, Black Crown Quarterly).

She has also written columns and articles for Lifetime TV online, The Big Issue, and Comic Heroes magazine.

== Personal life ==
Moore lives in Liverpool with Reppion and their children.

== Bibliography ==
=== Comics ===
- Wild Girl (with co-author John Reppion, and art by Shawn McManus and J.H. Williams III, Wildstorm, 2006).
- Albion (plotted by Alan Moore, with co-author John Reppion, and art by Shane Oakley, Wildstorm, 2006).
- Accent Anthologies (with co-author John Reppion):
- Witchblade: "Shades of Gray" (with co-author John Reppion, and art by Stephen Segovia, Top Cow/Dynamite Entertainment, 2007)
- Raise the Dead (with co-author John Reppion, and pencil by Hugo Petrus and inks by Marc Rueda, 4-issue mini-series, Dynamite Entertainment, 2007, tpb, 120 pages, February 2008, ISBN 1-933305-56-8)
- Savage Tales: "Battle for Atlantis" (with co-author John Reppion, and art by Pablo Marcos, in Savage Tales #1–3, Dynamite Entertainment, 2007)
- Gene Simmons House of Horrors: "Into The Woods" (with co-author John Reppion, and art by Jeff Zornow, IDW Publishing, 2007, tpb, 192 pages, April 2008, ISBN 1-60010-209-3)
- Space Doubles: "Project: Obeah" (with co-author John Reppion, and art by Jeremy Dale and Jason Roth, Th3rd World Studios, 2007)
- Nevermore: "The Black Cat" (with co-author John Reppion, and art by James Fletcher, Eye Classics, Self Made Hero, October 2007, ISBN 978-0-9552856-8-4)
- "Deadeye" (with co-author John Reppion and art by Matt Timson, in Popgun No. 1, Popgun No. 2, Image Comics, 2007/2008)
- Darkness vs. Eva (with co-author John Reppion and art by Edgar Salazar)
- Tori Amos - Comic Book Tattoo (with co-author John Reppion), Image Comics, 2008.
- Doctor Who: "The Whispering Gallery" (with co-author John Reppion and art by Ben Templesmith, one-shot, IDW Publishing)
- The Complete Dracula (with co-author John Reppion and art by Colton Worley, 5-issue limited series, Dynamite Entertainment 2009)
- The Trial of Sherlock Holmes (with co-author John Reppion, Dynamite Entertainment 2009)
- The Complete Alice In Wonderland (with co-author John Reppion, Dynamite Entertainment 2010).
- The Thrill Electric with co-author John Reppion and art by WindFlower Studio, October 2011.
- Sherlock Holmes – The Liverpool Demon (with co-author John Reppion), Dynamite Entertainment, 2013
- Black Shuck (with co-author John Reppion), 2000 AD, 2014.
- Storm Warning - "The Relic" (with co-author John Reppion), 2000 AD, 2015.
- Sway (with co-author John Reppion), Electricomics, 2015.
- Damsels (with co-author John Reppion), Dynamite Entertainment, 2015.
- Ghost Stories of an Antiquary Vol 1 (with co-author John Reppion), Self Made Hero, 2015.
- Ghost Stories of an Antiquary Vol 2 (with co-author John Reppion), Self Made Hero, 2016.
- Damsels Vol 2 (with co-author John Reppion), Dynamite Entertainment, 2016.
- Black Shuck - Sins of the Father (with co-author John Reppion), 2000 AD, 2016.
- Storm Warning - "Over My Dead Body" (with co-author John Reppion), 2000 AD 2018.
- Conspiracy of Ravens (with co-authors John Reppion and Sally Jane Thompson), Dark Horse, 2018.
- Sherlock Holmes - The Vanishing Man (with co-author John Reppion), Dynamite Entertainment, 2019.
- Storm Warning - "Green and Pleasant Land" (with co-author John Reppion), 2000 AD 2019.
- The Doors - Morrison Hotel, Z2 comics, 2021.
- Megadeth - Death By Design (with co-author John Reppion), Heavy Metal Magazine, 2019.
- Kyle Thomas - Guardian of the Realm (with co-author John Reppion), Penguin Michael Joseph, 2022.
- Mötley Crüe - The Dirt Declassified, Z2 comics, 2022.
- Tori Amos - Little Earthquakes, Z2 comics, 2022.
- Joan Jett and the Blackhearts - I love Rock n Roll / Bad Reputation, Z2 comics, 2022.
- Queens of the Lost World (with co-author John Reppion and artist Silvia Califano) Opus Comics, 2023.

=== Books ===
- #WOMAN: Remapping the Territory Our Way (contributor), Rich Witch Films & Publishing, 2018.
- The Outcast Hours (contributor), Solaris, 2019.
