= Colin Teague =

British film and television director

Colin Teague (born 1970) is a British film and television director.

Teague grew up in High Wycombe, Buckinghamshire and studied at Redroofs Theatre School and the London International Film School.

He is most associated with Doctor Who, being the first person to have directed for the main series and both of its spin-offs, Torchwood and the pilot episode of The Sarah Jane Adventures. In 2009 and 2011, Teague was BAFTA Award-nominated for Being Human. In 2011, he directed Frankenstein's Wedding, broadcast live from Leeds on BBC3, and Shirley, a biopic on the singer Shirley Bassey which won a Cymru Bafta for Best Single Drama. In 2012, he directed The Town, a three-part drama for ITV. In 2013, he directed The White Queen for BBC/Starz, which was nominated for three Golden Globe Awards.

== Selected filmography ==
- The Last Drop (2005)
- Holby City (2003–2006)
- Torchwood
  - "Ghost Machine" (2006)
  - "Greeks Bearing Gifts" (2006)
  - "Sleeper" (2008)
  - "Meat" (2008)
- The Sarah Jane Adventures
  - "Invasion of the Bane" (2007)
- Doctor Who
  - "The Sound of Drums" (2007)
  - "Last of the Time Lords" (2007)
  - "The Fires of Pompeii" (2008)
- Being Human
  - Series 1, Episode 5 (2009)
  - Series 1, Episode 6 (2009)
  - Series 2, Episode 1 (2010)
  - Series 2, Episode 2 (2010)
  - Series 2, Episode 3 (2010)
  - Series 3, Episode 1 (2011)
  - Series 3, Episode 2 (2011)
  - Series 3, Episode 3 (2011)
- Shirley (2011)
- Sinbad
  - "Kuji" (2012)
  - "Eye of the Tiger" (2012)
  - "For Whom the Egg Shatters" (2012)
- The Town (three-part TV drama, 2012)
- The White Queen
  - BBC/Starz TV series (2013)
- Dragonheart 3: The Sorcerer's Curse (2015)
- Spotless
  - Not a Place, a Circumstance (2015)
  - Someone's Son, Somebody's Daughter (2015)
- Da Vinci's Demons
  - Alis Volat Propriis (2015)
  - La Confessione Della Macchina (2015)
- Jekyll & Hyde
  - The Harbinger (2015)
  - Mr Hyde (2015)
  - The Cutter (2015)
- Beowulf: Return to the Shieldlands
  - Episode #1.6 (2016)
  - Episode #1.7 (2016)
- Hooten & the Lady
  - The Amazon (2016)
  - Rome (2016)
- James Patterson's Murder Is Forever
  - Murder Interrupted (2018)
  - Mother of All Murders (2018)
- Rashash (2021)
  - Session 1
- Esaaf (2025)
