= Eisner Award for Best Painter/Digital Artist =

American comic book award

- Awarded for: Best Painter/Digital Artist for Comic Books
- Country: United States
- First award: 1993
- Most recent winner: Martin Simmonds
- Website: www.comic-con.org/awards/eisner-awards-current-info

The Eisner Award for Best Painter/Digital Artist is an award for creative achievement in American comic books. It is awarded to a comic book artist for interior art.

The award was named "Best Painter" from 1993 to 1999, "Best Painter/Multimedia Artist" from 2000 to 2019, and "Best Painter/Digital Artist" from 2020 to present. The term "(interior art)" has been inconsistently added to the end of the award's name.

== Winners and nominees ==
Year	Nominee	Titles	Ref.
1993	Dave Dorman	Aliens: Tribes (Dark Horse Comics)	
1993	Simon Bisley	Lair of the Lizard Ladies in Mr. Monster Attacks #3 (Tundra Publishing)	
1993	John Bolton	Army of Darkness (Dark Horse Comics)	
1993	Dan Brereton	Clive Barker's Dread (Eclipse Comics)	
1993	Teddy Kristiansen	Tarzan: Loves, Lies, and the Lost City (Malibu Comics)	
1993	Dave McKean	Signal to Noise (VG Graphics/Dark Horse Comics)	
1993	Jim Woodring	Frank in the River (Tundra Publishing), "Frank" in Pictopia #2 (Fantagraphics Books)	
1994	Alex Ross	Marvels (Marvel Comics)	
1994	Mark Chiarello	Batman/Houdini: The Devil's Workshop (DC Comics)	
1994	Scott Hampton	The Upturned Stone (Kitchen Sink Press)	
1994	Teddy Kristiansen	Grendel Tales: Four Devils, One Hell (Dark Horse Comics)	
1995	Jon J. Muth	The Mystery Play (DC Comics/Vertigo Comics)	
1995	Christopher Moeller	Shadow Empires: Faith Conquers (Dark Horse Comics)	
1995	Miguelanxo Prado	Streak of Chalk (NBM Publishing)	
1995	Jim Silke	Rascals in Paradise (Dark Horse Comics)	
1995	Jim Woodring	Jim (Fantagraphics Books)	
1996	John Bolton	Batman: Manbat (DC Comics/Vertigo Comics)	
1996	Dan Brereton	The Nocturnals (Malibu Comics/Bravura Comics)	
1996	Teddy Kristiansen	Bacchus Color Special (Dark Horse Comics)	
1996	David Wenzel	Fairy Tales of the Brothers Grimm (NBM Publishing)	
1996	Phil Winslade	Goddess (DC Comics/Vertigo Comics)	
1997	Alex Ross	Kingdom Come (DC Comics)	
1997	Dan Brereton	Batman: Thrillkiller (DC Comics)	
1997	Joseph Michael Linsner	Dawn (Sirius Entertainment)	
1997	Miguelanxo Prado	Tangents (NBM Publishing)	
1998	Alex Ross	Uncle Sam (DC Comics/Vertigo Comics)	
1998	John Bolton	Menz Insana (DC Comics/Vertigo Comics), "The Flowers of Romance" in Vertigo: Winter's Edge (DC Comics/Vertigo Comics)	
1998	Gene Ha	"Free Fall" in Shadows & Light (Marvel Comics)	
1998	Scott Hampton	Batman: Dark Knight Dynasty (DC Comics), Destiny: A Chronicle of Deaths Foretold Book Two (DC Comics/Vertigo Comics)	
1998	David Wenzel	The Wizard's Tale (Homage Comics)	
1999	Alex Ross	Superman: Peace on Earth (DC Comics)	
1999	Kyle Baker	You Are Here (DC Comics/Vertigo Comics)	
1999	Dan Brereton	Batgirl and Batman: Thrillkiller '62 (DC Comics)	
1999	David W. Mack	Kabuki (Image Comics)	
2000s
2000	Alex Ross	Batman: War on Crime (DC Comics)	
2000	Kyle Baker	I Die at Midnight (DC Comics/Vertigo Comics), Letitia Lerner, Superman's Babysitter in Elseworlds 80-Page Giant (DC Comics)	
2000	John Bolton	Gifts of the Night (DC Comics/Vertigo Comics)	
2000	Jill Thompson	Scary Godmother: The Mystery Date (Sirius Entertainment)	
2001	Jill Thompson	Scary Godmother (Sirius Entertainment)	
2001	Christian Gossett and Team Red Star	The Red Star (Image Comics)	
2001	David W. Mack	Kabuki #9 (Image Comics)	
2001	George Pratt	Batman: Harvest Breed (DC Comics)	
2001	Charles Vess	Rose #1 (Cartoon Books)	
2001	Yslaire	From Cloud 99: Memories, Part 1 (Humanoids Publishing)	
2002	Charles Vess	Rose (Cartoon Books)	
2002	Allen Coulter and Snakebite Cortez	The Red Star (Image Comics)	
2002	Dave McKean	Pictures That Tick (Hourglass Studios/Allen Spiegel Fine Arts)	
2002	David W. Mack	Daredevil #16-19 (Marvel Comics)	
2002	John Van Fleet	Batman: The Ankh (DC Comics)	
2003	George Pratt	Wolverine: Netsuke (Marvel Comics)	
2003	Eric Drooker	Blood Song: A Silent Ballad (Harcourt)	
2003	David W. Mack	Kabuki: The Ghost Play (Image Comics)	
2003	Lorenzo Mattotti	Dr. Jekyll & Mr. Hyde (NBM Publishing)	
2004	Jill Thompson	"Stray" in The Dark Horse Book of Hauntings (Dark Horse Comics)	
2004	Juanjo Guarnido	Blacksad (ibooks)	
2004	Ladronn	Hip Flask: Elephantmen (Comicraft)	
2004	Miguelanxo Prado	"Dream" in The Sandman: Endless Nights (Vertigo Comics/DC Comics)	
2004	Frank Quitely	"Destiny" in The Sandman: Endless Nights (Vertigo Comics/DC Comics)	
2005	Teddy Kristiansen	It's a Bird... (Vertigo Comics/DC Comics)	
2005	Juanjo Guarnido	Blacksad, Book 2: Arctic Nation (ibooks)	
2005	David W. Mack	Kabuki (Marvel Comics)	
2005	Ben Templesmith	30 Days of Night: Return to Barrow (IDW Publishing)	
2005	Michael Zulli	Creatures of the Night (Dark Horse Comics)	
2006	Ladronn	Hip Flask: Mystery City (Active Images)	
2006	Paul Guinan	Heartbreakers Meet Boilerplate (IDW Publishing)	
2006	Ben Templesmith	Fell (Image Comics)	
2006	Kent Williams	The Fountain (Vertigo Comics/DC Comics)	
2007	Jill Thompson	"A Dog and His Boy" in The Dark Horse Book of Monsters (Dark Horse Comics), "Love Triangle" in Sexy Chix (Dark Horse Comics), "Fair Division" in Fables: 1001 Nights of Snowfall (Vertigo Comics/DC Comics)	
2007	Nicolas de Crécy	Glacial Period (NBM Publishing)	
2007	Melinda Gebbie	Lost Girls (Top Shelf Productions)	
2007	Ben Templesmith	Fell (Image Comics), The Looking Glass Wars: Hatter M (Desperado Publishing/Image Comics), Wormwood: Gentleman Corpse (IDW Publishing)	
2007	Brett Weldele	Southland Tales: The Prequel Saga (Graphitti Designs), Silent Ghost (Markosia)	
2008	Eric Powell	The Goon: Chinatown (Dark Horse Comics)	
2008	Ann Marie Fleming	The Magical Life of Long Tack Sam (Riverhead Books/Penguin Group)	
2008	Bryan Talbot	Alice in Sunderland (Dark Horse Comics)	
2008	Ben Templesmith	Fell (Image Comics), 30 Days of Night: Red Snow (IDW Publishing), Wormwood: Gentleman Corpse (IDW Publishing)	
2009	Jill Thompson	Magic Trixie (Harper Children's Books), Magic Trixie Sleeps Over (Harper Children's Books)	
2009	Lynda Barry	What It Is (Drawn & Quarterly)	
2009	Eddie Campbell	The Amazing Remarkable Monsieur Leotard (First Second Books)	
2009	Enrico Casarosa	The Venice Chronicles (Ateliér Fio/AdHouse Books)	
2009	Scott Morse	Tiger!Tiger!Tiger! (Red Window)	
2010s
2010	Jill Thompson	Beasts of Burden (Dark Horse Comics), Magic Trixie and the Dragon (Harper Children's Books)	
2010	Émile Bravo	My mommy is in America and she met Buffalo Bill (Fanfare/Ponent Mon)	
2010	Mauro Cascioli	Justice League: Cry for Justice (DC Comics)	
2010	Nicolle Rager Fuller	Charles Darwin on the Origin of Species: A Graphic Adaptation (Rodale Books)	
2010	Carol Tyler	You’ll Never Know: A Good and Decent Man (Fantagraphics Books)	
2011	Juanjo Guarnido	Blacksad (Dark Horse Comics)	
2011	Lynda Barry	Picture This: The Nearsighted Monkey Book (Drawn & Quarterly)	
2011	Brecht Evens	The Wrong Place (Drawn & Quarterly)	
2011	Janet K. Lee	Return of the Dapper Men (Archaia Entertainment)	
2011	Éric Liberge	On the Odd Hours (NBM Publishing)	
2011	Carol Tyler	You’ll Never Know Book 2: Collateral Damage (Fantagraphics Books)	
2012	No Eisner Award for Best Painter/Multimedia Artist was presented in 2012 as the judges "didn't find enough contenders that reached the level of quality they were looking for."		
2013	Juanjo Guarnido	Blacksad (Dark Horse Comics)	
2013	Brecht Evens	The Making Of (Drawn & Quarterly)	
2013	Teddy Kristiansen	The Red Diary/The RE[a]D Diary (Man of Action Entertainment/Image Comics)	
2013	Lorenzo Mattotti	The Crackle of the Frost (Fantagraphics Books)	
2013	Katsuya Terada	The Monkey King, vol. 2 (Dark Horse Comics)	
2014	Fiona Staples	Saga (Image Comics)	
2014	Andrew C. Robinson	The Fifth Beetle (Dark Horse Comics)	
2014	Sonia Sanchéz	Here I Am (Capstone Publishers)	
2014	Ive Svorcina	Thor (Marvel Comics)	
2014	Marguerite Van Cook	7 Miles a Second (Fantagraphics Books)	
2014	Judith Vanistendael	When David Lost His Voice (SelfMadeHero)	
2015	J. H. Williams III	The Sandman: Overture (Vertigo Comics/DC Comics)	
2015	Lauri Ahonen and Jaakko Ahonen	Jaybird (Dark Horse Comics)	
2015	Colleen Coover	Bandette (MonkeyBrain Books)	
2015	Mike del Mundo	Elektra (Marvel Comics)	
2015	Juanjo Guarnido	Blacksad: Amarillo (Dark Horse Comics)	
2016	Dustin Nguyen	Descender (Image Comics)	
2016	Federico Bertolucci	Love: The Tiger (Magnetic Press), Love: The Fox (Magnetic Press)	
2016	Colleen Coover	Bandette (MonkeyBrain Books)	
2016	Carita Lupattelli	Izuna (Humanoids Publishing)	
2016	Tony Sandoval	A Glance Backward (Magnetic Press)	
2017	Jill Thompson	Wonder Woman: The True Amazon (DC Comics), Beasts of Burden: What the Cat Dragged In (Dark Horse Comics)	
2017	Federico Bertolucci	Love: The Lion (Magnetic Press)	
2017	Brecht Evens	Panther (Drawn & Quarterly)	
2017	Manuele Fior	5,000 km per Second (Fantagraphics Books)	
2017	Dave McKean	Black Dog: the Dreams of Paul Nash (Dark Horse Comics)	
2017	Sana Takeda	Monstress (Image Comics)	
2018	Sana Takeda	Monstress (Image Comics)	
2018	Federico Bertolucci	Love: The Dinosaur (Lion Forge Comics/Magnetic Press), Little Tails (Lion Forge Comics/Magnetic Press)	
2018	EFA	Monet: Itinerant of Light (NBM Publishing)	
2018	Jean-Pierre Gibrat	Flight of the Raven (EuroComics/IDW Publishing)	
2018	Cyril Pedrosa	Portugal (NBM Publishing)	
2019	Dustin Nguyen	Descender (Image Comics)	
2019	Lee Bermejo	Batman: Damned (DC Comics)	
2019	Carita Lupatelli	Izuna, book 2 (Humanoids Publishing)	
2019	Grégory Panaccione	A Sea of Love (Magnetic Press/Lion Forge Comics)	
2019	Tony Sandoval	Watersnakes (Magnetic Press/Lion Forge Comics)	
2020s
2020	Christian Ward	Invisible Kingdom (Berger Books/Dark Horse Comics)	
2020	Didier Cassegrain	Black Water Lilies (Europe Comics)	
2020	Alexandre Clérisse	Diabolical Summer (IDW Publishing)	
2020	David W. Mack	Cover (DC Comics)	
2020	Léa Mazé	Elma, A Bear’s Life, vol. 1: The Great Journey (Europe Comics)	
2020	Julie Rocheleau	Wrath of Fantômas (Titan Books)	
2021	Anand RK/John Pearson	Blue in Green (Image Comics)	
2021	Benjamin Adam	Soon (Europe Comics)	
2021	Alice Chemama	The Zolas (Europe Comics)	
2021	Jared Cullum	Kodi (Top Shelf Productions)	
2021	Decur	When You Look Up (Enchanted Lion Books)	
2021	Antonio Lapone	Gentlemind (Europe Comics)	
2022	Sana Takeda	Monstress (Image Comics)	
2022	Federico Bertolucci	Brindille, Love: The Mastiff (Magnetic)	
2022	John Bolton	Hell’s Flaw (Renegade Arts Entertainment)	
2022	Juan Cavia	Ballad for Sophie (Top Shelf)	
2022	Frank Pe	Little Nemo (Magnetic)	
2022	Ileana Surducan	The Lost Sunday (Pronoia AB)	
2023	Sana Takeda	Monstress, The Night Eaters: She Eats the Night (Image Comics)	
2023	Lee Bermejo	A Vicious Circle (BOOM! Studios)	
2023	Felix Delep	Animal Castle (Ablaze)	
2023	Daria Schmitt	The Monstrous Dreams of Mr. Providence (Europe Comics)	
2023	Zoe Thorogood	Rain (Syzygy/Image)	
2024	Sana Takeda	Monstress, The Night Eaters: Her Little Repears (Image Comics)	
2024	Jason Shawn Alexander	Blacula: Return of the King (Zombie Love Studios)	
2024	Chaiko	The Monkey King (Magnetic)	
2024	Juanjo Guardido	Blacksad, Vol 7: They All Fall Down, Part 2 (Europe Comics)	
2024	Liam Sharp	Nocterra: Nemesis Special (Best Jackett), Starhenge: The Dragon and the Boar (Image)	
2024	Martin Simmonds	Universal Monsters: Dracula	
2025	Eduardo Risso	The Blood Brothers Mother (DSTLRY)	
2025	Frederic Bremaud and Federico Bertolucci	Donald Duck: Vacation Parade	
2025	Leela Corman	Victory Parade (Pantheon)	
2025	Benjamin Flao	The Hidden Life of Trees (Greystone)	
2025	Merwan	Aster of Pan (Magnetic Press)	
2025	Maria Sweeney	Brittle Joints (Street Noise Books)	
2026	Martin Simmonds	The Department of Truth (Image)	
2026	Teddy Kristiansen	Black Hammer: Spiral City (Dark Horse)	
2026	Cathy Malkasian	Shadows of the Sea (Fantagraphics)	
2026	Qu	Slices of Life: A Comic Montage (Bulgilhan Press)	
2026	Mika Song	Night Chef: An Epic Tale of Friendship with a Side of Deliciousness! (Random House Graphic)	
2026	Linnea Sterte	A Garden of Spheres (Peow)	

== Multiple awards and nominations ==
The following individuals have won Best Painter/Digital Artist one or more times:

Colorist	Wins	Nominations
Jill Thompson	6	7
Alex Ross	5	5
Juanjo Guarnido	2	5
Sana Takeda	4	5
Dustin Nguyen	2	2
Teddy Kristiansen	1	5
John Bolton	2	4
Charles Vess	1	2
George Pratt	1	2
Ladronn	1	2
Dave Dorman	1	1
Jon J. Muth	1	1
Eric Powell	1	1
Fiona Staples	1	1
J.H. Williams III	1	1
Christian Ward	1	1

The following individuals have received two or more nominations but never won Best Painter/Digital Artist:

Colorist	Nominations
David W. Mack	6
Dan Brereton	4
Ben Templesmith	4
Federico Bertolucci	4
Dave McKean	3
Miguelanxo Prado	3
Brecht Evens	3
Jim Woodring	2
Scott Hampton	2
David Wenzel	2
Kyle Baker	2
Lorenzo Mattotti	2
Lynda Barry	2
Carol Tyler	2
Colleen Coover	2
Tony Sandoval	2
