= Natalie Obiko Pearson =

Investigative journalist

- Education: Princeton University
- Occupation: Investigative journalist
- Employer: Bloomberg News
- Awards: Pulitzer Prize for Illustrated Reporting and Commentary (2026)

Natalie Obiko Pearson is an investigative journalist and senior investigative reporter for Asia at Bloomberg News, based in Tokyo. She won the 2026 Pulitzer Prize for Illustrated Reporting and Commentary with visual artist Anand RK and journalist Suparna Sharma for trAPPed, an illustrated investigation of digital-arrest scams in India.

Pearson has twice received a Gerald Loeb Award, winning for explanatory journalism in 2017 as part of the team behind the Bloomberg series Superbug Spreaders and for feature writing in 2025 for The Egg. She was also part of the Bloomberg staff named a finalist for the 2024 Pulitzer Prize for Investigative Reporting for an examination of the United States government's role in the international spread of firearms.

== Early life and education ==
Pearson was raised in Japan and is a member of Princeton University's class of 1999. She later became a 2009 Knight-Bagehot Fellow at the Columbia University Graduate School of Journalism.

== Career ==
=== Early reporting ===
Pearson's early reporting included work from Japan for The Associated Press. Her bylined articles published by The Japan Times during the early 2000s covered subjects including former Peruvian president Alberto Fujimori, internet-linked suicide pacts, migration, discrimination against former patients with Hansen's disease, public health and Japanese society.

During a career spanning more than two decades, Pearson has reported in three languages from approximately 20 countries. Her assignments have included the emergence of Narendra Modi as a national political figure in India, the socialist government of Hugo Chávez in Venezuela and the Organization of the Petroleum Exporting Countries during a period of historically high oil prices.

=== Bloomberg News ===
Pearson has held reporting and editorial assignments for Bloomberg in several international bureaux. By 2021, she was a senior reporter and Bloomberg's Vancouver bureau chief. She subsequently became Bloomberg's senior investigative reporter for Asia and was based in Tokyo by 2026.

Pearson's investigative reporting has addressed public health, international arms sales, technology, philanthropy, racism and reproductive medicine. Her work has combined conventional reporting with data analysis, international fieldwork and illustrated or multimedia presentation.

== Major investigations ==
=== Antimicrobial resistance ===
While based in India, Pearson initiated reporting on the use of antibiotics in agriculture and its contribution to antimicrobial resistance. The resulting Bloomberg project included investigations into antibiotic use in poultry farming in India, drug-resistant infections and the international food supply.

The project, entered for the Gerald Loeb Awards as Superbug Spreaders, received the 2017 award for explanatory reporting. It also received an Award for Excellence in investigative reporting from the Society of Publishers in Asia, whose judges described the work as a globally relevant, data-supported investigation.

=== Race, technology and philanthropy ===
Pearson received the 2021 Christopher J. Welles Memorial Prize for a body of business reporting on race, technology and philanthropy. The recognized work examined the relationship between anti-Asian hostility and housing economics, the expansion of the Chinese technology company Huawei in the international 5G market, and the decline of a major international charitable organization.

=== International firearms trade ===
Pearson contributed to Bloomberg's America, Global Gun Pusher investigation, which examined how the United States government promoted international sales by American firearms manufacturers and how exported weapons were connected to violence outside the country.

For the series, Pearson co-wrote an investigation of changes in Canadian firearms ownership, political organizing and gun violence. The wider project was named a finalist for the 2024 Pulitzer Prize for Investigative Reporting. The Pulitzer board credited it with prompting the administration of President Joe Biden to suspend most civilian firearm-export approvals for 90 days while federal policies were reviewed.

=== The Egg ===
Pearson spearheaded The Egg, a year-long Bloomberg investigation into the international market for human egg cells used in fertility treatment. The project followed women in India, Argentina, Greece, Taiwan and the United States whose experiences illustrated ethical and regulatory issues within the global egg-donation industry.

The Egg received the 2025 Gerald Loeb Award for feature writing. It was also recognized in the National Headliner Awards, whose judges highlighted the investigation's international scope and its accounts of exploitation, disputed consent and cross-border fertility markets.

=== trAPPed ===
In 2025, Pearson and Delhi-based investigative journalist Suparna Sharma investigated so-called digital-arrest scams in India. In these schemes, criminals impersonate police officers or other government authorities and use video calls, threats and prolonged psychological pressure to convince victims that they are under official investigation.

Pearson and Sharma travelled across India, interviewed victims and investigators, and examined documents, phone records, messages and financial transactions. Their reporting centred on a neurologist who was kept under virtual surveillance and coercive control through her telephone for eight days.

The investigation was presented partly as trAPPed, an illustrated narrative created with artist Anand RK. It was Bloomberg's first graphic novel, although Pearson emphasized that its scenes were based on reported events rather than fictional invention. The format was intended to convey the psychological pressure experienced by scam victims and the way the crime itself unfolds through digital screens.

The Pulitzer Prize Board awarded Pearson, Sharma and Anand RK the 2026 Pulitzer Prize for Illustrated Reporting and Commentary, citing the work's combination of words and images in examining digital fraud and surveillance. The broader project, titled India's Digital Dream, Hacked, also received the Overseas Press Club of America's Kim Wall Award for creative digital reporting on international affairs. It won first place for digital presentation of a single feature topic at the 2026 National Headliner Awards.

== Awards and recognition ==
Pearson's selected awards and distinctions include:

- 2009: Knight-Bagehot Fellowship in Economics and Business Journalism, Columbia University
- 2017: Gerald Loeb Award for explanatory reporting, for Superbug Spreaders
- 2017: Society of Publishers in Asia Award for Excellence in investigative reporting, for Superbug Profiteers
- 2021: Christopher J. Welles Memorial Prize
- 2024: Pulitzer Prize finalist in investigative reporting, as part of the Bloomberg staff responsible for America, Global Gun Pusher
- 2025: Gerald Loeb Award for feature writing, for The Egg
- 2026: Kim Wall Award, Overseas Press Club of America, with Suparna Sharma and Anand RK, for India's Digital Dream, Hacked
- 2026: First place, National Headliner Award for digital presentation of a single feature topic, for India's Digital Dream, Hacked
- 2026: Pulitzer Prize for Illustrated Reporting and Commentary, with Suparna Sharma and Anand RK, for trAPPed
