= Frank (comics) =

- Frank, from the cover of Frank in the River (Fantagraphics, 1992)

Publication information
- Publisher: Fantagraphics Books; Tundra Publishing
- First appearance: JIM #4
- Created by: Jim Woodring
Frank
- Cover to Frank #2 (Fantagraphics, 1996)
Publication information
- Schedule: irregular
- Format: comic book
- Genre: Alternative comics, Fantasy comics, Pantomime comics
- Publication date: September 1996 – February 2001
- No. of issues: 4

Frank is a cartoon character created by American cartoonist Jim Woodring. Frank is a bipedal, bucktoothed animal of uncertain species whom Woodring described as a "generic anthropomorph". The stories and supporting characters appear in a world called the Unifactor.

== Overview ==
Frank is a bipedal anthropomorphic animal character of uncertain species—what his creator Jim Woodring describes as a "generic anthropomorph". The surreal, symbolic, and pantomimic stories take place in an idyllic world of mysterious forces called the Unifactor. Woodring describes Frank as "11 years old ... covered with short, dense fur like a mole's ... innocent but not noble ... mortal and must someday die". His pets and protectors Pupshaw and Pushpaw accompany him on his wanderings through the Unifactor, where he encounters colorful, top-shaped jivas, geometrically shaped Jerry Chickens, the diabolic moon-faced Whim, his "Faux Pa" (or "false father"), and the avaricious Manhog. Frank is prey to his temptations and subverts expectations by not always triumphing; despite the consequences he undergoes, he never learns from his experiences.

== Publication history ==
The first published drawing of Frank was the cover of Jim #4, and the first comic story featuring the character was in Buzz #2, the Kitchen Sink Press-published comics anthology. Frank was a regular feature in the Tantalizing Stories series by Woodring and Mark Martin, and dominated that comic's inaugural special issue, Tantalizing Stories Presents Frank in the River. When Tantalizing Stories ended Frank became a recurring feature in Jim Volume II; in 1996 he got his own self-titled comic series which ran for four issues. A long Frank story titled Frank's Real Pa also appeared in 1994's The Millennium Whole Earth Catalog and was later released as a comic book. Two book collections of the Frank stories were released in 1994 and 1997. In 2003 The Frank Book collected nearly all of the previously published Frank stories as well as the conclusion of "Frank's High Horse", a serialized story that had been left unfinished at the end of the Frank comic book. In 2005 a standalone, limited-release comic The Lute String was released, and beginning in 2010 two full-length graphic novels featuring Frank were published.

=== Frank series ===
From 1996 to 2001 Fantagraphics put out four issues of Woodring's series Frank. All but the first issue included one color story. The ending to "Frank's High Horse"—the first two installments of which appeared in the last two issues of Frank—was only published when Fantagraphics put out the deluxe The Frank Book in 2003 (it was later included in The Portable Frank as well).

Issues of Frank
#	Date	Stories
1	Sept 1996	"High-Rise Hopper"; "Gentlemanhog"
2	Dec 1997	"Sprank" (color); "Pushpaw"; untitled
3	March 2000	"Trosper" (color); "Frank's High Horse" (part 1); "Bliss"
4	Feb 2001	"Frank's High Horse" (part 2); untitled (color)

Frank Graphic Novels
Title	Date
Weathercraft	June 2010
Congress of the Animals	June 2011

== Characters ==
The stories involving these characters occur in the surreal world Woodring calls the Unifactor.

Frank
A bipedal, bucktoothed animal of uncertain species with a short tail, described by Woodring as a "generic anthropomorph" and "naive but not innocent", "completely naive, capable of sinning by virtue of not knowing what he's really about." The character design is reminiscent of those found in American animated shorts from the 1920s and 1930s, such as from Fleischer Studios. Usually he appears in black and white, but when he appears in color his fur is purple.
Manhog
An "unholy hybrid of human ambivalence". Woodring says he sympathizes with Manhog: "He is very much at a disadvantage because of his looks and his weak character. He’d be good if he could, and when given a chance, he is good. But he has no discipline, no grit, no ability to select a better path and stick with it." Earlier, however, Woodring had said he was "completely craven, incapable of a good act." His acts often led to a very nasty, bloody end.
Whim
A perpetually smiling, devilish character who inhabits a body with a moon-shaped head, "the spirit of politics". When the body is destroyed, it turns out that Whim is actually a "tiny, malicious worm" that is able to crawl inside others (including Frank) and has the power of transformation. According to Woodring, "[h]e’s a conniver, a user. His body can be smashed, but he always gets a new one. Much in the same way that politicians are more or less interchangeable. They surrender their individuality to be part of that hideous game."
The Jerry Chickens
Mischievous chicken-like characters, each a different geometric shape.
Pupshaw
A female canine-like "godling" companion whom Frank bought from one of the Jerry Chickens in an early story. Testy in nature, but a faithful protector to Frank.
Pushpaw
Pupshaw's somewhat simple-minded but plucky and good-natured mate and male counterpart.
Lucky
A man with a grotesquely elongated, pendulous proboscis for a mouth. His feet are wrapped in rags and he wears a nightgown. He is a born drudge taking on the most menial work (the best job was being a delivery man in the story that introduced Pupshaw). In another story, he is amputating his proboscis, a painful task.
Frank's Pas
Identical creatures that resemble older, less anthropomorphic versions of Frank. One of them (Frank's "Real Pa") is Frank's father; the other is thus his "Faux Pa". Frank will look like them when he grows old. They are physically identical to one another except for one tiny difference. The Faux Pa enthusiastically embraces his role as a father figure and gives Frank the worst possible advice.

== Influence and recognition ==
While the Frank stories have never been a mainstream success, they have attracted an avid cult following and have been extensively merchandised as t-shirts, action figures and other things. Many alternative cartoonists (Dave Cooper, for example) have cited the Frank stories as an inspiration, and mainstream comic book creators have also expressed their admiration, with Alan Moore including an image of Frank as part of an alternate universe in the pages of his superhero series 1963. Various artists have created short Frank animations based on Woodring's original tales, nine of which were collected on the 2007 DVD release, Visions of Frank: Short Films by Japan's Most Audacious Animators.

Woodring has won multiple Harvey Awards for his Frank stories, including the Best Single Issue or Story award for "Frank in the River" in 1993. In 1999 The Comics Journal ranked the Frank stories #55 in its list of the 100 best comics of the century.

Frank is also referenced on the Channel 4 sitcom The IT Crowd. A color poster of Frank is prominently displayed on the wall behind the desk of main character Roy.

Yo La Tengo bassist James McNew has a tattoo of the characters Pupshaw and Pushpaw on his arm.

== Bibliography ==
Year	Title	Publisher	ISBN	Notes
1994	Frank Vol. 1	Fantagraphics Books	978-1-560-97153-5	
1997	Frank Vol. 2	Fantagraphics Books	978-1-56097-279-2	
2002	Trosper	Fantagraphics Books	1-56097-426-5	with music by Bill Frisell
2003	The Frank Book	Fantagraphics Books	1-56097-534-2	foreword by Francis Ford Coppola
2008	The Portable Frank	Fantagraphics Books	978-1-56097-978-4	foreword by Justin Green
2010	Weathercraft	Fantagraphics Books	978-1-60699-340-8	
2011	Congress of the Animals	Fantagraphics Books	978-1-60699-437-5	
2013	Fran	Fantagraphics Books	978-1-60699-661-4	
2018	Poochytown	Fantagraphics Books	978-1-68396119-2	
2020	And Now, Sir… Is This Your Missing Gonad?	Fantagraphics Books	978-1-68396326-4	
2022	One Beautiful Spring Day	Fantagraphics Books	978-1-68396-555-8	a compilation of Congress of the Animals, Fran and Poochytown, along with 100 pages never before published

=== Foreign editions ===
Translations
Language	Title	Publisher	Year	ISBN
French	Frank	l'Association	1998	2-84414-005-X
French	Frank, Tome 1	l'Association	2001-07-13	978-2-844-14005-0
French	Frank, Tome 2	l'Association	2006-09-11	978-2-844-14216-0
French	Frank's Real Pa: Suivi de Frank et la corde de luth	l'Association	2007-01-20	978-2-844-14224-5
Japanese	Pupshaw and Pushpaw	Press Pop	2004	4-9900812-9-3
Japanese	The Lute String リュートの弦	Presspop Gallery	2005	978-4-90309-003-0
Japanese	The Frank color stories	Presspop Gallery	2006	978-4-90309-006-1
Japanese	Black & White Frank	Press Pop	2011	978-4-903090-28-3
Weathercraft
Dutch	Weersomstandigheden	De Bezige Bij	2009–11	978-9-054-92275-9
Norwegian	Værverk	Jippi Comics	2009–11	978-8-292-22623-0
French	Weathercraft	l'Association	2010-01-09	978-2-844-14390-7
Italian	Weathercraft	Coconino Press	2010-07	978-8-876-18169-6
Congress of the Animals
French	Frank et le congrès des bêtes	l'Association	2011-04-29	978-2-844-14422-5
Norwegian	Dei samlar seg, dyra	Jippi Comics	2011-05	978-8-292-22634-6

== See also ==
- The Book of Jim
- Pantomime
