= Fran (comics) =

- First edition front cover
- Creator: Jim Woodring
- Date: 2013
- Series: Frank
- Page count: 104 pages
- Publisher: Fantagraphics Books

Chronology
- Preceded by: Congress of the Animals (2011)
- Followed by: Poochytown (2018)

Fran is a graphic novel by American cartoonist Jim Woodring released in 2013. The wordless book is the third Frank graphic novel, following Weathercraft (2010) and Congress of the Animals (2011). After the anthropomorphic Frank violently loses his self-control with his secretive female counterpart Fran, whom he discovered at the end of Congress of the Animals, she leaves him, and he sets out in search of her.
