= Frank in the River =

Comic story by Jim Woodring

- The opening panel of "Frank in the River"

Publication information
- Publisher: Tundra
- Format: One-shot
- Genre: Alternative comics
- Publication date: 1992
- No. of issues: 1

Creative team
- Created by: Jim Woodring

Frank in the River is a 24-page comic story by Jim Woodring.

Like all Frank stories, Frank in the River is virtually wordless and the story is conveyed entirely in pantomime.

== Publication history ==
It was published by Tundra in 1992 in a special full-color issue of Tantalizing Stories, Tantalizing Stories Presents Frank in the River, and features Woodring's signature character, Frank. The special issue also included a shorter full-color story by Mark Martin featuring his character Montgomery Wart.

== Plot synopsis ==
While trespassing inside an elaborate ornamental garden, Frank accidentally knocks over a huge statue, destroying it and part of a wall. Receiving a bill for the damages, he takes a job cleaning the inside and grounds of a large building which seems to be a palace. While he is cleaning he notices a red cistern in the center of one of the palace rooms. At the end of the day he is fed a meal of gruel by Manhog, who apparently is also a palace employee.

The next morning a swarm of strange monsters clamber out of a nearby river and onto the palace grounds. Frank runs out to battle with them, and by the end of the day has killed them all. He buries their corpses in a hole which he covers with a large rock. Cleaning up after the battle, he peeks in the cistern and finds a small figurine which resembles the statue he knocked over. At dinner, Frank finds that Manhog has chopped up the remains of the monsters he killed and cooked them into a nauseating porridge. Rejecting the food, Frank goes to bed.

That night Frank is awakened by a light turning on. Getting up, he sees Manhog moving around, and surreptitiously follows him down a long flight of stairs to an underground canal. Frank's attempts to find out what Manhog is up to are thwarted when he unexpectedly encounters a stop sign, which causes him to tear back towards his room in a panic. After catching his breath he looks in the cistern again, and finds a different figurine shaped like one of the monsters he fought earlier.

Getting an idea, Frank makes a figurine that looks like himself and puts it in the cistern. Soon a small squad of Frank clones emerge from the river. The real Frank, pleased with himself, sits back and smokes a pipe, while Manhog is dismayed by the approaching clones. Manhog looks in the cistern and finds the Frank figurine, which he smashes on the ground in anger.

Down in the mess hall the Frank clones wait expectantly for food. Manhog again serves up his same monster carcass porridge. Unlike the real Frank, the clones hungrily lap it up. When one of the clones bites down on a hard object in his porridge, all the clones are alarmed to see that it is the figurine of the destroyed statue. They chase Manhog back into the kitchen, where they are appalled to see evidence of the carnage that went into making their meal. The Frank clones seize both Manhog and the remaining monster carcasses and drag them into the river, where they all disappear.

The real Frank, observing the scene from a telescope, is happy. He reclaims the statue figurine and puts it back in the red cistern. Having earned much money from the work he has been doing, he quits his job and goes to repay the owner of the garden, but the owner (unseen except for his hand, but apparently a normal human being) simply pats him on the head and allows him to keep the money. Frank goes to a real estate agent and buys himself a house, from which he can look out and see the place where he previously toiled.

== Collected editions ==
Frank in the River is reprinted in the book collections Frank Volume 1 (1996, ISBN 1-56097-153-3) and The Frank Book (2003, ISBN 1-56097-534-2), both published by Fantagraphics Books.

== Reception ==
Frank in the River was the first full-color Frank story by Woodring, and is still his longest color story to date. Its intense, luminous hues won Woodring the 1993 Harvey Award for Best Colorist, while the special issue it appeared in won the award for Best Single Issue or Story. Woodring and the story were also each nominated for an Eisner Award, for Best Painter (Interior) and Best Short Story respectively.

The logic of cause and effect behind the sequence of events in Frank in the River is notoriously difficult to figure out. Woodring once released a limited facsimile edition of the complete rough draft of the story, "with a caption under each panel explaining just what is going on."
