= Tantalizing Stories =

Comic book by Mark Martin and Jim Woodring

Cover of the fourth issue of Tantalizing Stories, depicting Jim Woodring's character Frank and featuring artwork by both creators

Tantalizing Stories was a comic book series by Mark Martin and Jim Woodring published by Tundra Publishing. The contents of each black and white issue were divided between the two cartoonists and featured a variety of comic short stories, illustrations and text pieces. The series was the original venue for most of Woodring's early stories featuring his character Frank, which were later collected into several books. It also printed stories of Martin's recurring character Montgomery Wart. Although the series was ostensibly aimed at children, it developed a readership among fans of alternative comics.

Six regular issues of Tantalizing Stories plus the full-color special Tantalizing Stories Presents Frank in the River were released between 1992 and 1994.

Tantalizing Stories and both of its creators were nominated for multiple Harvey Awards in 1993 and 1994. The special issue Tantalizing Stories Presents Frank in the River won the award for Best Single Issue or Story in 1993, and Woodring was awarded Best Colorist for his work in that issue.
