= Øystein Runde =

Norwegian cartoonist

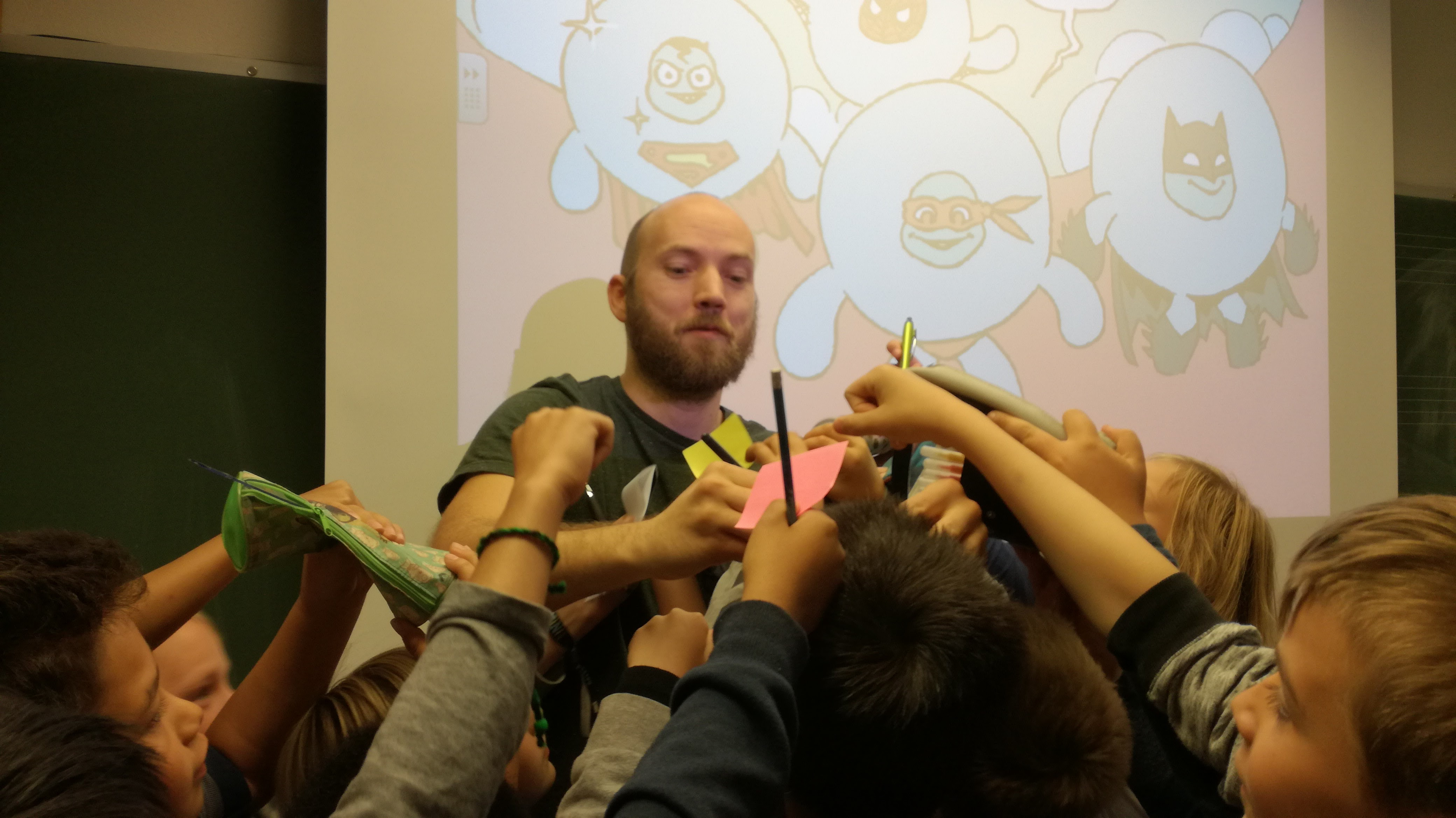
- Born: December 14, 1979 (age 45); Ulsteinvik, Norway
- Occupation(s): Comics writer and comics artist

Øystein Runde (born December 14, 1979, in Ulsteinvik) is a Norwegian comics writer and comics artist. Runde, Kristopher Schau and Frode Hanssen published the weekly science/humor podcast 80% from 2019 to 2020, after its end in october 2020 when Schau moved to Drammen, Runde started an english-language science podcast called Wunderdog, where he talks to "the scientists behind the ideas". Guests so far have been professor Philip Lubin who invented the concept for Stephen Hawking and Yuri Milners "Breakthrough starshot" laser, professor Robin Hanson who invented the term "The Great Filter" and wrote Age of Em about mind uploads, doctor Cynthia Phillips from NASA, staff scientist for the Europa Clipper project.

== Early years ==
Debuted as a 19-year-old with winning a competition in Norway's biggest youth magazine, Spirit, with a 3-page comic in rhyme. Broke through as a 21-year-old as co-writer and artist on Margarin, a family saga that was compared to David Cronenberg, David Lynch and Dave Cooper. Margarin ran in the magazine Smult and marked the co-writing debut of Norwegian comedian and musician Kristopher Schau, who later created the TV series Dag When collected, Margarin was considered a cult comic and got generally favorable reviews, with the exception of Norway's then-leading comics critic Morten Harper, who called Smult "Norway's most important comics magazine", but also noted that the main course, Margarin, was "disgusting" and "what happens in it could hardly be called sex".

Runde abandoned the detailed drawings of Margarin to create a strip of stick figures. The stick figure strips got collected in 2008.

== Writing ==
Runde then turned completely to writing: Futen with Knut Solberg and two graphic novels for artist Geir Moen, De Fire Store (The Grand Four). The steampunk action comedy took advantage of the fact that four of Norway's 18th century writers, Henrik Ibsen, Bjornstjerne Bjornson, Alexander Kielland and Jonas Lie are collectively called "the grand four". Runde and Moen reimagined them as a reluctantly assembled team of special agents, forced to cooperate because of a zombie invasion in the Frogner Park. De Fire Store book 1 got all over favourable reviews, while book 2 was considered well drawn and full of ideas.

2009 saw the publication of Runde's biggest project after Margarin, the Saga of Olav Sleggja. Sleggja was drawn in a more realistic style than any of his other works.

Sleggja got a sequel in 2018, Berserk. Berserk got enthusiastic reviews.

In 2017, Øystein also published his first fact book, Stamceller, kroppens superheltar (Stem cells, superheroes of the body). Among other things, it follows stem cell researcher Cecilie Gjerde on her quest to regenerate jawbone. Dagbladet called it "A book that makes your kid smarter than you."

English versions of his work are sometimes made available for supporters on his Patreon page.

== Projects ==
For Sleggja, co-director Lars-Petter Iversen and Runde created a live-action trailer. Sleggja was praised for its intense and touching story.

In 2015, Øystein Runde and Ida Neverdahl published a travelogue comic, MOSCOW, in English.

Also the book FUTEN, about a mythological tax collector, was finally published after 8 years of work by artist Knut André Solberg. Futen was well received.

Together with co-director and producer Torstein Jacobsen and co-director Johanna Raita, Runde released a horror comedy, Last Christmas.

== Bibliography ==
- Rundetid – Monthly strip in the zine Spirit
- Margarin – published in the comic Smult, written by Kristopher Schau
- 2004 – Bjartmann – Jippi Comics, Oslo
- 2004 – Bjartmann er din presang – Jippi Comics
- 2006 – Margarin – collected edition in hardcover Seriehuset AS
- 2007 – De Fire Store – graphic novel in hardcover, drawn by Geir Moen Gyldendal
- 2008 – Rundetid – collected edition in hardcover Gyldendal
- 2009 – Soga om Olav Sleggja Samlaget
- 2010 – De Fire Store – Bukk fra luften, bukk fra bunnen, Obstfelder er forsvunnen – graphic novel, hardcover, drawn by Geir Moen Cappelen Damm
- 2011 – De Fire Store – julen 1898 (Christmas special) Cappelen Damm
- 2012 - "Elefanten Tommy" Cappelen Damm
- 2012 - "Bjartmann" - collected edition in hardcover Jippi Comics
- 2013 - MOSKVA - with Ida Eva Neverdahl Jippi Comics
- 2016 - FUTEN
- 2017 - Stamceller - kroppens superheltar Gyldendal – kids' fact book about stem cell research.
- 2017 - Los Angeles - with Ida Eva Neverdahl Jippi comics
- 2018 - Sleggja Berserk Gyldendal
