= Ben Templesmith =

Australian comic book artist and author

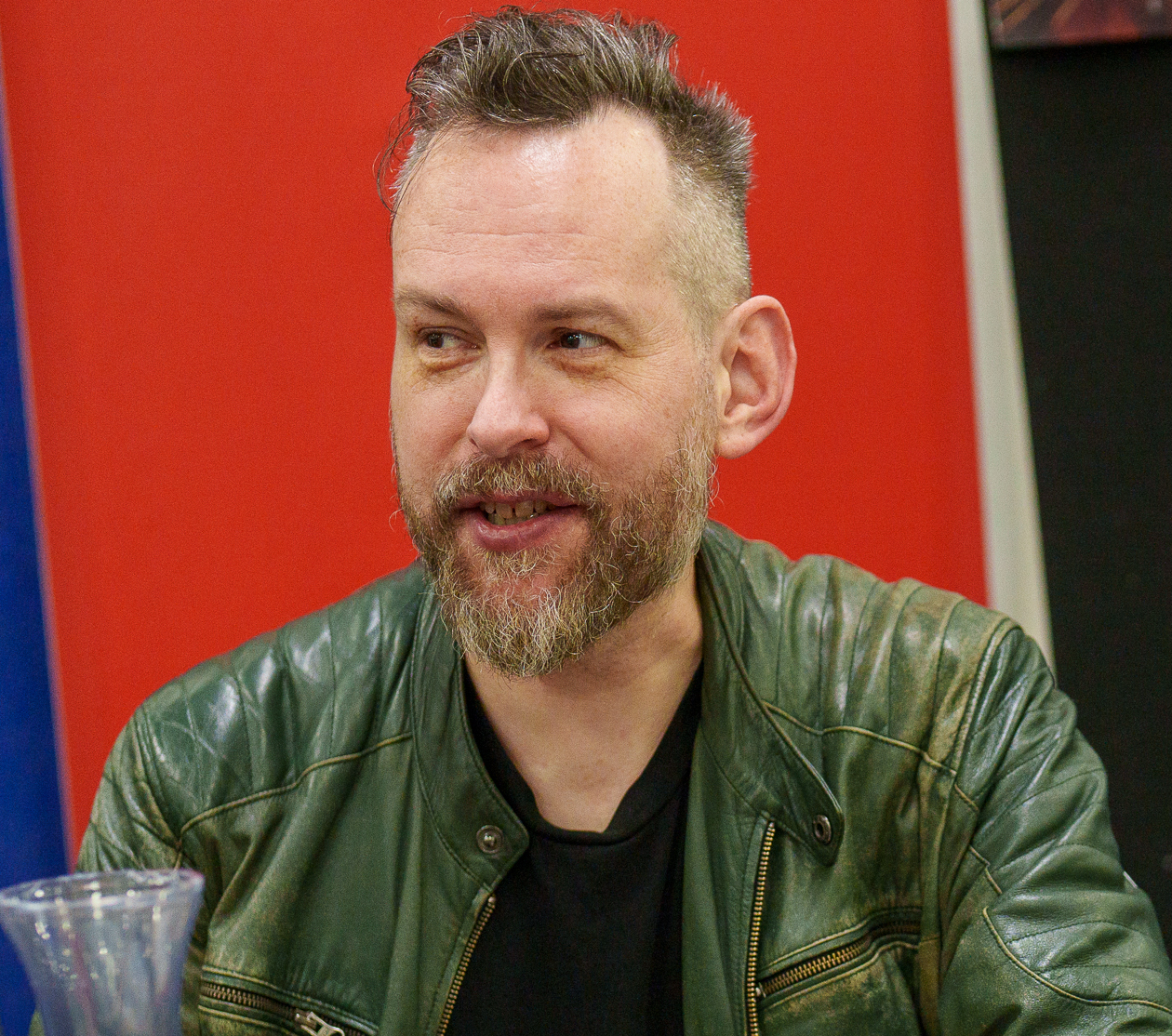
- Templesmith at Galaxy Con Columbus in 2025
- Born: 7 March 1984 (age 42) Perth, Western Australia
- Areas: Writer, Artist
- Notable works: 30 Days of Night; Fell; Wormwood: Gentleman Corpse; Singularity 7; Welcome To Hoxford
- Awards: Spike TV Scream Award; IHG Award; Eagle Award

Ben Templesmith (born 7 March 1984) is an Australian comic book artist best known for his work in the American comic book industry, most notably the Image Comics series Fell, with writer Warren Ellis, and IDW's 30 Days of Night with writer Steve Niles, which was adapted into a motion picture of the same name. He has also created book covers, movie posters, trading cards, and concept work for film.

== Early life ==
Templesmith was born 7 March 1984, in Perth, Western Australia. He graduated from Curtin University with a bachelor's degree in Design, and holds a diploma of Cartoon and Graphic Art from the Australian College of Journalism.

== Career ==
Templesmith produced his first commercial American comics work in 2001, providing the art for Todd McFarlane Productions' Hellspawn, which was published by Image Comics. He has gone on to create his own original works as well as contribute to many licensed properties at various publishers, most notably IDW Publishing, with which he had an exclusive agreement through most of 2008 and part of 2009 before returning to being a freelancer.

Other licensed properties that Templesmith has worked on include illustrating "Dark Journey", a story in issue #17 of the Dark Horse Comics anthology series Star Wars Tales in 2003, and the covers to Devil's Due Publishing's Army of Darkness: Ashes to Ashes #1 in 2004 and IDW's G.I. Joe #0 in 2008.

Original works Templesmith has produced include the miniseries Welcome to Hoxford, the New York Times best-selling Wormwood: Gentleman Corpse Tommyrot: The Art of Ben Templesmith, Conluvio and Choker at Image Comics with writer Ben McCool. He also provided a number of covers for the Oni Press series Wasteland.

In April 2012, DC Entertainment announced that Templesmith would be one of the artists illustrating a new digital Batman series with stories set outside regular DC continuity.

In March 2013, Image Comics announced Ten Grand with writer J. Michael Straczynski, with Issue #1 published in May of the same year. In August, Templesmith vanished without giving any explanation, forcing the publisher to replace him with CP Smith starting with Issue #5.

Starting in November 2014, Templesmith launched Gotham by Midnight from DC Comics with writer Ray Fawkes. It was poorly received ; DC Comics quickly replaced Templesmith by Juan Ferreyra (starting with Issue #6) before cancelling the series after Issue #12.

In June 2021, Templesmith announced that he would be reteaming with Ellis to continue the series, in spite of the scandal around sexual coercion/numerous affair-having allegations against Ellis ("So many of us") since 2020. That same month, Image Comics made a separate announcement stating that they would not be publishing the planned continuation in light of the backlash.

Since 2014, Templesmith's career has been limited to a handful of self-published releases.

== Awards ==
- 2007 International Horror Guild Award for Illustrated Narrative (with Thomas Ligotti, Joe Harris, Stuart Moore, Michael Gaydos, Colleen Doran and Ted McKeever for The Nightmare Factory)
- 2007 Spike TV Scream Award for Best Comic Book (with Steve Niles for 30 Days of Night)
- 2010 Eagle Award for Favourite Colourist
- 2023 Inkpot Award

=== Nominations ===
- 2005 Eisner Award for Best Limited Series (for 30 Days of Night: Return to Barrow, with Steve Niles)
- 2005 Eisner Award for Best Painter/Multimedia Artist (for 30 for Days of Night: Return to Barrow)
- 2006 Eisner Award for Best Continuing Series (with Warren Ellis for Fell)
- 2006 Eisner Award for Best New Series (with Warren Ellis for Fell)
- 2006 Eisner Award for Best Painter/Multimedia Artist (for Fell)
- 2007 Eisner Award for Best Limited Series (with Frank Beddor, Liz Cavalier for The Looking Glass Wars: Hatter M)
- 2007 Eisner Award for Painter/Multimedia Artist (for The Looking Glass Wars: Hatter M)
- 2006 International Horror Guild Award for Illustrated Narrative (with Steve Niles for Dark Days)
- 2006 International Horror Guild Award for Graphic Narrative (with Steve Niles and Ashley Wood for 30 Days of Night issues 1–3)
- 2007 Horror Guild Award for Illustrated Narrative (for Wormwood Gentleman Corpse: Birds, Bees, Blood & Beer)

== Selected bibliography ==
=== Comics ===
- Hellspawn (artist, Image Comics, 2002)
- 30 Days of Night (co-creator and artist, with Steve Niles, IDW Publishing, 2002)
- Dark Days (co-creator and artist, with Steve Niles, IDW Publishing, 2003)
- Criminal Macabre (artist, with Steve Niles, Dark Horse Comics, 2003)
- Wormwood: Gentleman Corpse (creator and writer/artist, LOFI Magazine, 2004–2006, IDW Publishing, 2006–present)
- 30 Days of Night: Return to Barrow (co-creator and artist, with Steve Niles, IDW Publishing, 2004)
- Singularity 7 (creator and writer/artist, IDW Publishing, 2004)
- Blood-Stained Sword (co-creator and artist, IDW Publishing, 2004)
- Silent Hill: Dying Inside (artist, with Scott Ciencin, IDW Publishing, 2004)
- 30 Days of Night: Bloodsucker Tales (co-creator and artist, with Matt Fraction, IDW Publishing, 2004–2005)
- Hatter M (artist, with Frank Beddor and Liz Cavalier, Image Comics, 2004–2006)
- Shadowplay (co-creator and artist, IDW Publishing, 2005)
- Fell (co-creator and artist, with Warren Ellis, Image Comics, 2005–present)
- 30 Days of Night: Red Snow (co-creator and writer/artist, IDW Publishing, 2007)
- Dead Space (artist, with Antony Johnston, 2008, Image Comics)
- Welcome To Hoxford (creator and writer/artist, IDW Publishing, 2008)
- Doctor Who - The Whispering Gallery (artist, with Leah Moore and John Reppion, 2009)
- Groom Lake (co-creator, with Chris Ryall, IDW Publishing, 2009)
- Choker (co-creator, with Ben McCool, Image Comics, 2012)
- Ten Grand (artist), with J. Michael Straczynski, Image Comics, 2013
- Gotham By Midnight (Artist) (co-creator, with Ray Fawkes, DC Comics, 2014)

=== Game books ===
- Superiors 4: Rogues to Riches (In Nomine) (2000) Steve Jackson Games, Interior Artist
- Faiths and Pantheons (Forgotten Realms) (2002) Wizards of the Coast, Interior Artist
- City of the Spider Queen (Forgotten Realms) (2002) Wizards of the Coast, Interior Artist
- Fiend Folio (Dungeons and Dragons) (2003) Wizards of the Coast, Interior Artist
- Nomads (2004; artist; White Wolf Game Studio)

=== Art books ===
- Tommyrot: The Art of Ben Templesmith (IDW Publishing)
- Conluvio: The Art of Ben Templesmith, Vol. 2 (IDW Publishing)
- SquidGirls: Erotica Tentacular
