= Singularity 7 =

2004 science-fiction comic by Ben Templesmith

- A variant cover for Issue 1

Publication information
- Publisher: IDW Publishing
- Schedule: Monthly
- Format: Mini-series
- Genre: , cyberpunk, gothic science fiction, post-apocalyptic
- Publication date: July - October 2004
- No. of issues: 4

Creative team
- Created by: Ben Templesmith
- Written by: Ben Templesmith
- Artist: Ben Templesmith

Collected editions
- Singularity 7: ISBN 1-932382-53-4

Singularity 7 is a four-issue comic book mini-series created, written, and illustrated by Ben Templesmith. It was published by American company IDW Publishing in 2004. The series combines elements of science-fiction, cyberpunk, and horror, to tell the story of a post-apocalyptic dystopian future.

The title is a reference to the multiple definitions of ‘singularity’. Burton C. Bell's introduction to the collected volume references the myriad ways in which the word can (and is) used in the comic, as well as giving a humorous nod to the 'singularity' of the writer. "…the definition [of singularity] expands beyond average intelligence. When I first heard the term, Stephen Hawking defined it when he was describing what might await at the bottom of black holes. All matter that is swallowed by the mighty gravitational pull of a black hole is reduced to a singularity, the size of an atom. That is mind blowing. The term is also used to describe that which is solely unique. This could be an individual or an object. Once in a great while, the world is graced with a Singularity. I believe this term is a perfect description for the latest addition to the world of graphic artists..."

== Background ==
The series marked a departure for Templesmith as it was his first attempt at scripting his own comic. In comparing the experience of writing Singularity to Wormwood: Gentleman Corpse he has said: "Singularity 7 was a first attempt at going it alone. I didn't want to start with Wormwood, so I wanted to pick another smaller thing first. Whatever the outcome of that mini-series was, the process was different to how I do it now. For Singularity 7 and such, I was doing all the art from a basic plot and then adding dialogue after the event. Now I write the whole thing out first, conversationally, and then map out the pages from there, just tweaking the dialogue at the end. I think it works a hell of a lot better, too."

== Story ==
The comic tells the story of how Earth was forever changed after alien nanites arrived in a meteor shower. The nanites, able to shift the molecular structure of any material, bond with the mind of Bobby Hennigan who initially uses the nanites power to improve life on Earth by building complex machines and curing disease. Unfortunately, Bobby goes crazy, becoming a God-like monster called ‘The Singularity’, destroying everything and forcing humanity to live deep beneath the surface of the Earth.

This new world is post-apocalyptic, filled with monsters, poisonous gases, and the nanites, which are now used to devour human flesh. The only things able to go to the surface are the "Gosiodo" - part man / part machine creatures connected to the hive mind of the Singularity and sent out to hunt down the remaining humans, and "Specials" - rare humans who, when exposed to the nanites are mysteriously not killed and instead bond with the nanites, giving them access to strange powers and the ability to survive on the surface.

Chon, a young man living in one of the underground cities has heard the stories of the "Topside" all his life, but shrugged them off as tall tales, until the Gosiodo find his city and expose it to nanites. Everyone is killed, except for Chon who becomes a Special with the ability to morph his arms into a liquid substance capable of eating through Gosiodo armor. Chon is found by a group of Specials led by Dead Eye. They bring Chon along with them to the largest remaining free city, where they have been summoned. Along the way, they are attacked by Gosiodo. Chon uses his arm morphing power against one and seemingly kills it. But in fact the Gosiodo lives, albeit disconnected from the hive mind of the Singularity.

Chon and the Specials arrive at the free city to learn that scientists there have created a virus that can kill the nanites, but for it to work it must be injected directly into the Singularity, who is highly protected in the "dead city". All the surviving specials that could be found, seven including Chon, set off to deliver the virus, a likely suicide mission.

The Gosiodo Chon almost killed attempts to reconnect to the hive, but is unable to. It comes across a woman carrying a baby. He notes that they look human but are in fact made of nanites. The Gosiodo wants to kill them, but can’t, something in his programming is preventing him.

The Specials fight their way through the Gosiodo-infested topside, toward the dead city. Along the way, Acrona is killed. This disheartens the others as Acrona was the oldest living Special. Chon wants to give up and go home, but Dead Eye won’t let him. Meanwhile, the Singularity has sensed the approach of the Specials and fears they will ruin the coming of the "Masters". The woman with the baby appears at the free city and asks to be let in. When the humans allow her entrance, however, she tells them that she is, in fact, a bomb and subsequently explodes, killing everyone.

At the edge of the Dead City, the Specials feel the deaths of so many humans. Again Chon and some of the other talk about giving up, but before they can move, Gosiodo surround them. The Specials fight their way to the center of the city and the Singularity. They arrive just as the mother ships of the Masters appear in the sky. The Specials attack the Singularity, but it makes short work of them, killing most of them, including Chon. Only Dead Eye and one other Special, Gunnar are left alive.

The "Masters" land. We learn that they are an alien race that sent the nanites. (The nanites infect one person, creating the Singularity, which then wipes out all life on the planet and terraforms it for the Master's use). But this Singularity's programming was corrupted somewhere along the way, which is why it's struggled to finish off mankind. The Master kills the Singularity only to discover that there is a second Singularity, the disconnected Gosiodo. The Masters kill this as well, but before they can, Dead Eye injects the virus, which infects not only the Singularity, but also the Masters. The nanites are destroyed, but the virus causes a giant explosion, which kills everyone, save a single baby.

== Characters ==
- Bobby Hennigan was once a regular guy, but when the nanites first came to Earth they took him over. For a while, he tried to do good with his newfound powers, but, soon, he went crazy and began killing everyone.
- Chon, distinguished by the dragon tattoo on his face, is the protagonist of the story. He becomes a Special when his city is destroyed by Gosiodo. He has the ability to turn his arm into a gooey substance which disables the Gosiodo. He is one of the seven Specials sent to destroy the Singularity.
- Geneva has black hair and carries swords. She also appears in the short story from IDW's Tales of Terror.
- Acrona is the oldest Special, even though she looks like a little girl. She is able to blow things up with a burst of green light.
- Deadeye is a Special whose eyes were eaten by nanites before they bonded with him. One of the seven Specials sent to destroy the Singularity, he is able to fight with a 'Nano-Sword'.
- Gunnar is a Special who is able to make guns from nothing.
- Gallis is the Special on the mission who can communicate with the free city. He has a chip implanted in his head which allows him to hear what the Professor is saying. He is the one who realizes when the bomb goes off and destroys the city.
- Makko is a Special who can make hard weapons from nothing. The character is also notable for being the only human with brightly colored hair, in this case, blonde.

== Themes ==
The series explores nanotechnology and its potential effects on human society. Templesmith, fascinated with the concept, has said that "nanotechnology will be like a tidal wave in a kiddie pool, compared to the information revolution our society has apparently recently gone through. It will transform everything." The comic also grapples with the moral and religious implications of technology. In writing about how nanites would allow humanity to play with the very molecules that society is made out of, and thus turn ordinary humans into gods, Templesmith is able to compare technological advancements with religious miracles and ask important questions about destiny and humanity's fate.

== Collected editions ==
IDW released a collection ("Singularity 7 TPB") with all four issues January 26, 2005 (ISBN 1932382534).
