= George Pratt (artist) =

American painter and comics artist

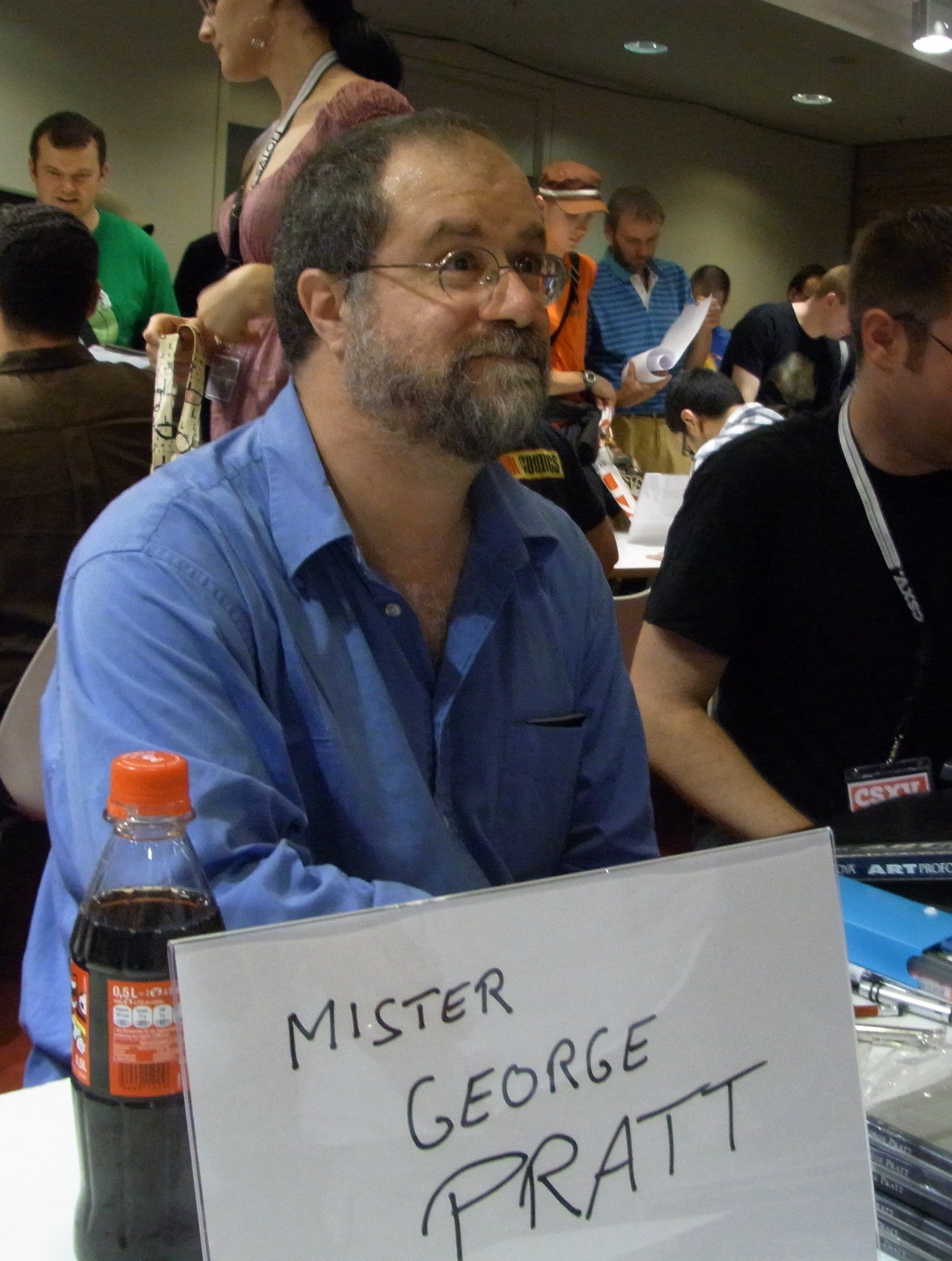
- Born: October 13, 1960 (age 66) Beaumont, Texas
- Areas: Artist, Writer
- Notable works: Enemy Ace: War Idyll
- Awards: Eisner Award, 2003

George Pratt (born October 13, 1960) is an American painter and illustrator known for his work in the comic book field.

== Biography ==
In 1980, at the age of 19, George Pratt left his native Beaumont, Texas, and moved to New York City to study drawing and painting at the Pratt Institute.

=== Comics ===
Pratt's cover for Legends of the Dark Knight #2 (DC, Dec. 1989).

Pratt's first published comics work was for Marvel Comics' Epic Illustrated #20 (1983). Since then, his work has appeared in Heavy Metal, Eagle, and many other publications. He has also inked other artists' work and created painted covers for DC Comics.

In 1990, DC published Pratt's first graphic novel, Enemy Ace: War Idyll, which was nominated for both the Eisner Award and the Harvey Award. Enemy Ace: War Idyll has been translated into nine languages and at one point was on the required reading list at West Point. The book won the France Info Award for Best Foreign Language Graphic Novel, and the British Speakeasy Award for Best Foreign Language Graphic Novel.

Pratt's painted graphic novel Batman: Harvest Breed (DC) was nominated for two Eisner Awards.

The Wolverine: Netsuke limited series for Marvel won Pratt the 2003 Eisner Award for Best Painter/Multimedia Artist.

As of the late 2000s, Pratt is working on the book See You in Hell, Blind Boy: A Tales of the Blues, based on his research of the Mississippi Delta. With Steven Budlong and James McGillion, Pratt made a documentary film about his Mississippi travels, also called See You in Hell, Blind Boy. The film won Best Feature Documentary at the 1999 New York International Independent Film & Video Festival.

=== Illustrations ===
Pratt has done cover and interior illustrations for books published by Bantam Books, Henry Holt, Warner Books, Mojo Press, and Random House, among others.

Pratt has exhibited his work many times at the Society of Illustrators, and is featured in the Society's compendium The Illustrator In America: 1860-2000 (written by Walter Reed).

Pratt has published collections of his original illustrations and sketches through art books Works and Murmurs.

Pratt has illustrated cards for the Magic: The Gathering collectible card game.

=== Teaching ===
Pratt taught for seven years at Pratt Institute. He has also taught painting and illustration at the Joe Kubert School of Cartoon and Graphic Art, the School of Visual Arts, the Savannah College of Art & Design, Virginia Commonwealth University, and currently at Ringling College of Art and Design. Additionally, during the summers Pratt teaches at the Illustration Academy in Kansas City, MO. At Virginia Commonwealth University, he taught the artist and illustrator, Gian Galang.

== Bibliography ==
- Enemy Ace: War Idyll (DC, 1990) ISBN 978-0-930289-78-2
- No Man's Land: A Postwar Sketchbook of the War in the Trenches (Tundra Press, 1992) ISBN 978-1-879450-64-6
- Batman: Harvest Breed (DC, 2003) ISBN 978-1-56389-775-7
