= Congress of the Animals =

2011 graphic novel by Jim Woodring

- Cover of Congress of the Animals
- Date: 2011
- Series: Frank
- Page count: 104 pages
- Publisher: Fantagraphics Books

Creative team
- Creator: Jim Woodring

Chronology
- Preceded by: Weathercraft (2010)
- Followed by: Fran (2013)

Congress of the Animals is a graphic novel by American artist Jim Woodring published on June 8, 2011. The book is Woodring's second book-length comic set in his fictional world, the Unifactor, and the first to star his most famous character, Frank.

The book was a finalist for the Los Angeles Times Book Prize for Graphic Novel.

== Background ==
While the book can be read and enjoyed on its own, it is enriched by having experienced Frank's history in the Unifactor. Knowing of Frank's previous life, in which he suffers no permanent consequences of his actions due to the balancing control of the Unifactor, gives depth to the changes Frank undergoes in Congress of the Animals.

Congress is the first of Woodring's books set in the Unifactor to star Frank since "Frank's High Horse", which was completed in 2003. Since the publication of The Frank Book, also in 2003, Woodring's comics output had been sparse, and the only two stories he had produced starred other characters: 2005's The Lute String starred Frank's pets and guardians, Pupshaw and Pushpaw, while 2010's Weathercraft starred Manhog.

== Overview ==
Quacky flies by Whim in a balloon. When Quacky taunts him, Whim bursts the balloon with a sharp rock. He tries to lighten his load by throwing out his baggage, some of which lands on Frank's property. Frank discovers a croquet set, and sets up a game with his pets and protectors, Pupshaw and Pushpaw. When pounding in one stake, however, the ground gives out and his home sinks.

A creature offers to rebuild his home. When finished, the creature demands payment, which is unexpected to Frank who, as a denizen of the Unifactor, expects events to balance themselves out. He must take a demanding factory job to pay the creature. At the factory he runs into Quacky. The two plot to escape from the factory by sabotaging one of the machines. They escape to an amusement park and make their getaway in a couple of gondolas. Frank's craft is attacked by a Leviathan and he is washed ashore.

On a faraway island outside the Unifactor, Frank discovers a giant statue of himself. While trying to make his way there, he comes across a town of gut-worshippers and undergoes a psychedelic experience. He leaves the settlement of the gut-worshippers and does battle with a monster, which he defeats. He helps out a number of other creatures to pull a many-faced "agency" out of a pit.

When he finally makes it to the statue, he finds that its resident is a female version of himself. They talk and have tea together, and Frank discovers that his host has a model of his new home, complete with miniature Pupshaw and Pushpaw. The two return to the Unifactor in what remains of the gondola. A mutilated Quacky is back in the Unifactor as well, but Frank passes him by.

Frank and his companion return to his home, where they are happily greeted by Pupshaw and Pushpaw, and they watch a fireworks show.

While in the Unifactor, nothing truly bad can happen to the characters—the Unifactor will always keep things in balance, and Frank never learns from his actions. However, outside of the Unifactor, Frank, whom Woodring has described as "ineducable" on the cover flaps of Weathercraft, may become educable.

== Characters ==
Quacky
Whim
Makes only a brief appearance. Taunted by Quacky from his balloon, Whim hurls a sharp stone at the balloon, bringing it down.
Frank

== Creation and publication ==
The book was published in the United States by Fantagraphics Books, and like Woodring's previous graphic novel, Weathercraft, Congress of the Animals was published directly in book form, without being serialized first, and was printed with same design approach as Weathercraft, giving the books the feeling of a series. It appeared about one year after Weathercraft. Some panels of the book were previewed on Woodring's blog leading up to publication.

Woodring says he was able to come out with Weathercraft and Congress of the Animals so quickly as they were both planned out before either being drawn. His next project will likely take a longer time to complete, as it is not yet written.

== Style ==
The book is done in Woodring's trademark black-and-white penwork, with hatching and shading done using wavy lines in subtle gradations reminiscent of woodblock printing. It has an unusually large number of double splashes throughout the book. It is executed in pantomime, as are all of Woodring's works set in the Unifactor. The characters are not meant to be silent, however—there is a climactic two-page scene in which Frank converses silently with his female counterpart, conveyed to the reader entirely through gestures and body language.

Frank himself is drawn in an extremely minimalist way, while the backgrounds and other creatures around him are drawn in obsessive detail. This serves to emphasize Frank's naivety and innocence—so that even, when he does wrong, the reader still finds it hard to criticize his actions.

== Reception ==
Edward Kaye of hypergeek.ca called Congress of the Animals the best work of his career and "a strong contender for graphic novel of the year, if not the decade", and Ned Lannamann of The Portland Mercury called it "among [Woodring's] most approachable and comprehensible works—a welcome change from last year's hallucinatory Weathercraft."

=== Critics' interpretations ===
Typically of Woodring's work, Congress is layered in metaphorical meaning and rewards repeated reading.

Sean Rogers, at The Comics Journal, suggests that, as Manhog in the past has had the opportunity and insight to attempt to better himself (especially in the short story "Gentlemanhog" and in Woodring's previous graphic novel, Weathercraft), now Frank for the first time may have such an opportunity. The story is more linear than the ones Woodring has drawn in the past, with a clear story arc, less focused on "[t]he mystery, ambivalence, and indecipherability" of his past stories with their "thinness of character and event".

== Foreign editions ==
Translations
Language	Title	Publisher	Year	ISBN
French	Frank et le congrès des bêtes	l'Association	2011-04-29	978-2-844-14422-5
