= Welcome to Hoxford =

Welcome To Hoxford

Publication information
- Publisher: IDW Publishing
- Schedule: Monthly
- Format: Mini-series
- Genre: Horror
- Publication date: September 2008 - November 2008
- No. of issues: 4

Creative team
- Created by: Ben Templesmith
- Written by: Ben Templesmith
- Artist(s): Ben Templesmith
- Letterer(s): Robbie Robbins
- Colorist(s): Ben Templesmith
- Editor(s): Chris Ryall; Tom Waltz

Welcome to Hoxford is a four-issue comic book mini-series created, written, and drawn by Eisner Award nominee and Spike Scream Award-winner Ben Templesmith and published from August to November 2008 by American company IDW Publishing.

The series focuses on a group of prisoners battling against werewolves in a privately run prison.

== Plot ==
Ray Delgado, a delusional murderer, and a handful of other dangerous death row prisoners are transferred from the state run prison system to the Hoxford, a privatized correctional institution owned by the Russian-based Usmanov Corporation. Dr. Jessica Ainley arrives at the prison to try and follow up on some of her old patients but her attempts are blocked by the Hoxford staff and her concerns for the prisoner's well-being are ignored. As the new prisoners settle in, conflict arises and after a bloody incident in the showers the inmates are put under lock down. Dr. Ainley keeps trying to gain access to her old patients, and after a shocking encounter with Ray she is locked in the Warden's office with a strange old man who sheds some light on the Usmanov Corporation, until nightfall when he and the entire prison staff transform into werewolves and begin hunting the prisoners. Ray, believing that as Cronos Lord of the Titans he must battle the monsters, leads the escaped prisoners to the prison armory where they stock up on weapons and then begin to fight back.

== Characters ==
=== Humans ===
Human characters include:

- Ray Delgado: Murderer, Delusional inmate with numerous Mental Health issues.
- Morton: Pedophile and Murderer.
- Burly Bill: Rapist and Murderer.
- Skunty: Necrophiliac and Murderer.
- Gravy: Cannibal and Murderer.
- Jones: Cop Killer and Torturer.
- Doctor Jessica Ainley: Psychiatrist.

=== Werewolves ===
The werewolves originate from Russia and live among humans. They operate Hoxford under the guise of a Russian corporation.

- Warden Baker: Hoxford Institution warden and werewolf leader.
- Hartnell: prison guard.
- Old man: Original leader of the wolves, usurped by Baker; the other wolves are unaware of the change.

== Film Adaptation ==
A live action fan film short adapted by Julien Mokrani and written by Samuel Bodin was made in 2011. Original score composed by Seppuku Paradigm with additional music by Zombie Zombie.

=== Cast ===
- Jason Flemyng - Ray
- Arben Bajraktaraj - Warden Gordon Baker
- Dexter Fletcher - Morton
- Scott Thrun - Young Ray
- Mickael Troudi - The Beast
- Elly Fairmann - The Rat/Ray's mother voice
- Eric Fantone - Bus Driver
