= Anand Radhakrishnan =

Indian illustrator and comics artist

- Other name: Anand RK
- Education: Sir J. J. Institute of Applied Art
- Known for: Illustration, comics art and comics journalism
- Notable work: Grafity's Wall; Blue in Green; Radio Apocalypse; Resurrection Man: Quantum Karma trAPPed
- Awards: Eisner Award (2021); Pulitzer Prize for Illustrated Reporting and Commentary (2026)
- Website: anandrk.art

Anand Radhakrishnan, known professionally as Anand RK, is an Indian illustrator, visual artist and comics artist based in Mumbai. His works include the graphic novels Grafity's Wall and Blue in Green, the comic series Radio Apocalypse and Resurrection Man: Quantum Karma, and illustrated journalism for Bloomberg News.

In 2021, Radhakrishnan and colourist John Pearson won the Eisner Award for Best Painter/Multimedia Artist (interior art) for their work on Blue in Green. He was reported as the first Indian to receive an Eisner Award. In 2026, he shared the Pulitzer Prize for Illustrated Reporting and Commentary with journalists Suparna Sharma and Natalie Obiko Pearson for the Bloomberg graphic story trAPPed.

== Early life and education ==
Radhakrishnan grew up in the Mumbai neighbourhoods of Andheri and Wadala. He attended St Joseph's School in Wadala and initially intended to pursue medicine. After completing secondary school, he enrolled in a Bachelor of Science programme at St. Xavier's College, Mumbai, but left the programme after deciding to study art.

He graduated from the Sir J. J. Institute of Applied Art in 2011 with a Bachelor of Fine Arts degree in applied art. He subsequently studied illustration for two years through The Art Department, an online art school. The institution closed before he could complete the final portfolio year of the programme.

== Career ==
=== Illustration and comics ===
After completing his studies, Radhakrishnan began working as a freelance illustrator. His early assignments included editorial and narrative illustration, book covers and independently initiated projects.

Comics writer Ram V encountered Radhakrishnan's work online in 2015 and commissioned him to create a cover for the independently published graphic novel Black Mumba. The two subsequently collaborated on a short science-fiction comic before beginning work on Grafity's Wall.

Grafity's Wall is a coming-of-age graphic novel about four teenagers pursuing their ambitions against the backdrop of Mumbai's street culture. It was initially financed through crowdfunding and released independently in 2018. An expanded edition, written by Ram V and illustrated by Radhakrishnan, was published by Dark Horse Comics in April 2020.

Radhakrishnan and Ram V next created Blue in Green, a psychological horror graphic novel about a musician's pursuit of artistic achievement. Radhakrishnan developed a mixed-media approach combining pencil and acrylic work, which was digitally coloured by John Pearson. Image Comics published the book on 28 October 2020. Its artwork received the 2021 Eisner Award for Best Painter/Multimedia Artist, jointly awarded to Radhakrishnan and Pearson.

Radhakrishnan later reunited with Ram V for Radio Apocalypse, a post-apocalyptic comic published by Vault Comics. He has also produced cover artwork for publishers including Boom! Studios, 2000 AD, Tiny Onion and Image Comics.

In 2025, Radhakrishnan illustrated Resurrection Man: Quantum Karma, a six-issue DC Black Label limited series written by Ram V and coloured by Mike Spicer. The series revived the Resurrection Man character and incorporated themes drawn from Indian and Buddhist philosophy and mythology.

=== trAPPed and the Pulitzer Prize ===
In April 2025, Radhakrishnan joined a Bloomberg investigation led by journalists Suparna Sharma and Natalie Obiko Pearson into “digital arrest” scams in India. The scams involve criminals impersonating law-enforcement officials and keeping victims under continuous surveillance through video calls while coercing them into transferring money.

Radhakrishnan travelled to Lucknow to observe a court hearing and visit locations connected to the case of a neurologist who had been kept under video surveillance by scammers. Working with Bloomberg's reporters, editors, colourist Nisha Singh and letterer Aditya Bidikar, he developed a predominantly black-and-white, line-heavy visual treatment designed for a vertically scrolling digital format.

The resulting graphic story, trAPPed, was published by Bloomberg on 4 December 2025 as part of the investigation India's Digital Dream, Hacked. The work recounts how a neurologist was isolated and controlled through her telephone while scammers extracted her family's savings.

In May 2026, Radhakrishnan, Sharma and Pearson received the Pulitzer Prize for Illustrated Reporting and Commentary for trAPPed. The Pulitzer board recognised the work for combining reporting, words and visuals to examine digital surveillance and international fraud.

== Artistic approach ==
Radhakrishnan has said that he does not attempt to maintain a single visual style across his work. He instead adapts his drawing methods, composition and choice of media to the tone and subject of each narrative. The exaggerated and colourful artwork of Grafity's Wall, for example, was intended to reflect its youthful characters and Mumbai setting, while the darker mixed-media treatment of Blue in Green was developed for themes involving grief, ambition, depression and artistic obsession.

His work combines traditional materials, including pencil, ink, acrylic and gouache, with digital colouring and production methods. For trAPPed, he adapted from fixed printed pages to an open-ended vertical format intended primarily for reading on smartphones.

== Selected works ==
- Black Mumba – cover art
- Grafity's Wall – artist and colourist; with Ram V, Irma Kniivila, Jason Wordie and Aditya Bidikar; expanded edition published by Dark Horse Comics, 2020
- Blue in Green – artist; with Ram V and John Pearson; Image Comics, 2020
- Radio Apocalypse – artist and cover artist; with Ram V; Vault Comics
- Ruin of Thieves – artist and colourist
- Resurrection Man: Quantum Karma – artist; with Ram V and Mike Spicer; DC Black Label, 2025
- trAPPed – illustrator; with Suparna Sharma and Natalie Obiko Pearson; Bloomberg, 2025

== Awards ==
- In 2021, Radhakrishnan and colourist John Pearson won the Eisner Award for Best Painter/Multimedia Artist (Interior Art) for Blue in Green.
- In 2026, Radhakrishnan shared the Pulitzer Prize for Illustrated Reporting and Commentary with Suparna Sharma and Natalie Obiko Pearson for the Bloomberg graphic report trAPPed.
