= Gian Galang =

American artist and illustrator

Gian Galang is an American artist and illustrator, specializing in images of martial arts and action sports.

== Early life and career ==
Galang was born in Los Angeles, but lived in Hong Kong until he was 10, when he then moved to Virginia. He studied at the Virginia Commonwealth University completing dual honors in illustration and graphic design. In his fifth year, he earned the prestigious place as a member of the Wieden & Kennedy 12. As a child he partook in Karate and Muay Thai and formed the basis of his inspiration. Other inspirations for his work came from video games and comic books. He credits the inspiration for his art style to George Pratt, one of his teachers at University.

His career began when he started placing images of his artwork on social media sites, such as Tumblr and Reddit. From this, he was noticed and asked by VICE to produce designs for their Fightland series. Since then, he has collaborated with Nike, Reebok, the UFC, HBO and Everlast.

In March 2021, Galang exhibited a series of paintings at Gallery Nucleus, in California, which explore the Art of Fighting.

Galang was one of the artists selected in 2026 to design commemorative coins by the United States Mint.
