= Wormwood: Gentleman Corpse =

Comic book series by Ben Templesmith

Publication information
- Publisher: IDW Publishing
- Schedule: Monthly
- Genre: Comedy Horror
- Main character(s): Wormwood; Mr. Pendulum; Phoebe Phoenix

Creative team
- Created by: Ben Templesmith
- Written by: Ben Templesmith
- Artist: Ben Templesmith
- Letterer(s): Robbie Robbins; Chris Mowry; Neil Uyetake
- Colorist: Ben Templesmith
- Editor(s): Chris Ryall; Dan Taylor

Collected editions
- Wormwood Volume 1: Birds, Bees, Blood & Beer: ISBN 1-60010-047-3
- Wormwood Volume 1 Deviant Edition Hardcover: Birds, Bees, Blood & Beer: ISBN 1-60010-375-8
- Wormwood Volume 2: It Only Hurts When I Pee: ISBN 1-60010-162-3
- Wormwood Volume 3: Calamari Rising: ISBN 1-60010-183-6

Wormwood: Gentleman Corpse is the second solo comic book series by creator Ben Templesmith. Unlike the bleak post-apocalyptic world of Templesmith's previous work, Singularity 7, Wormwood is a lighter series which combines humor and horror. It was first published as short episodic serials within LOFI magazine from 2004 until it ceased publication. IDW Publishing then collected those serials in a single #0 issue called The Taster in 2006 before releasing new stories in the form of several miniseries, the most recent being Calamari Rising. The hardcover edition of the initial series has gone on to be a New York Times bestseller.

== Plot ==
The stories of Wormwood: Gentleman Corpse revolve around the adventures of Wormwood, a trans-dimensional demigod worm, who frequently saves the world from supernatural threats. Wormwood can control a dead body by burrowing in his host's head; his preferred vessel is a well-dressed man, hence the subtitle. Although he repeatedly has made claims of godhood, he usually saves the world through cunning or otherwise underhanded means rather than force, such as paying off the Four Horsemen of the Apocalypse.
