= Weathercraft =

2010 graphic novel by American cartoonist Jim Woodring

- Cover of the first, hardcover printing of Weathercraft, featuring the hags "Betty and Veronica" and the head of Manhog
- Creator: Jim Woodring
- Date: 2010
- Series: Frank
- Page count: 104 pages
- Publisher: Fantagraphics Books

Chronology
- Followed by: Congress of the Animals (2011)

Weathercraft is a 2010 graphic novel by American cartoonist Jim Woodring, featuring his best-known characters Frank, Manhog and Whim. While Frank stars in most of Woodring's stories set in the fictional universe of the Unifactor, this book stars Manhog, with Frank making only a brief appearance. Manhog, after trials and tribulations, sets out on a transformative journey, returning to face off against the devilish Whim, who has enslaved and transformed his friends. Like all other stories set in the Unifactor, Weathercraft unfolds entirely in pictures, with no dialogue balloons or captions. Weathercraft was Woodring's first book-length work.

== Publication history ==
Weathercraft was published in book form without previously being serialized, a first for Woodring. Some panels of the book were previewed on Woodring's blog leading up to publication. When asked in an interview with The A.V. Club why, after 30 years of doing comics, he had now decided to produce his first graphic novel, he replied:

"It sounds kind of dumb, but I just didn’t think of doing it until recently. I used to publish these stories in 32-page comics, and I would either do short stories or break the long ones up into chunks so there would be some variety inside the Weathercraft comic. But since then, people have been doing more and more long, standalone works, and the term "graphic novel" has sort of become the codified term now. It just seemed like the time was right to do it. I always felt that I could do those Frank stories by the inch, yard, or mile. The length of the stories never really mattered that much to me."

— Jim Woodring

The dust jacket was quite verbose, in contrast with the pantomime of the book itself. On this he said, "I thought it would be funny to have a book that was almost word-free and a dust jacket that was slathered in copy."

== Overview ==
Aum This character is hidden somewhere in the artwork of every page of the book.

Weathercraft, like all of the works set in Woodring's Unifactor (the world in which Frank and associated characters appear), is executed in wordless pantomime, with no word balloons or captions of any kind. In contrast, the dust jacket is quite verbose, and provides clues to the interpretation of the story. "[A] cyclical telling of Manhog's suffering, punishment and enlightenment", the book actually stars Manhog, with Frank only appearing briefly. Another recurring character, the devilish Whim, also features.

The book is dense and intricate. It rewards (or requires) re-readings, and "blends [Woodring's] understanding of Vedantic beliefs with stylized, Max Fleischer nightmares to explore ideas about the evolution of consciousness. As if to hammer home this mysticism, Woodring notes that the Sanskrit symbol for the sacred syllable Aum [ॐ] is hidden on each page." Every detail of the book has meaning to Woodring, although he accepts and encourages "reader participation" and further or alternate interpretations.

=== Plot ===
After merging with a psychoactive plant known as Salvia divinorum, Whim proceeds to "distort and enslave Frank and his friends". After much suffering, Manhog sets out on a transformative journey, attaining enlightenment. Manhog then returns for a final encounter with Whim.

== Characters ==
Manhog
"[A] freakish creature that is often depicted as hedonistic villain whenever he isn't being forced to suffer." With some notable exceptions like the short story Gentlemanhog, Manhog is normally a secondary character in the stories set in the Unifactor, where Frank is normally the star.
The significant thing for Manhog in Weathercraft, according to Woodring, "is that [Manhog] feels morally obligated to clean up after himself" after being "responsible for Whim's acquiring a hallucinogenic plant-body...a first for him. He passes up a chance to enter paradise in order to do the right thing."

"In a lot of ways, Manhog is the most interesting character in the Unifactor. He has the most potential for change and the widest range of dramatic possibilities. Besides, it's fun to put him in awful circumstances and watch him suffer. There's something about a big fat guy screaming in terror that's just naturally funny. Oliver Hardy got a lot of mileage out of that formula."

— Jim Woodring, 2010, on Manhog being the star of Weathercraft

Whim
As in so many other stories, this devilish, perpetually smiling, moon-headed character spends his time tantalizing and torturing the inhabitants of the Unifactor. "[A]t one point [he] merges with a psychoactive plant called Salvia divinorum" and "distorts and enslaves Frank and his friends."
Frank
Normally the main character of the stories set in the Unifactor, Frank plays a small but important role in this book, distorted and enslaved by Whim early in the book.
Pupshaw and Pushpaw
Companions and protectors of Frank, they are distorted and enslaved along with him by the now super powerful Whim.
Frank's Faux Paw
Quadrupedal "bad conscience" of Frank, he plays a minor but critical role in the book. When participating in a forced marriage that is interrupted by Manhog, he reveals the location of the transformed Whim.
"Betty and Veronica"
Described on the dust jacket as "our grossly inappropriate pet names for the unchristened hags" who "seem to have elemental control over [Manhog's] life". They are "two bird-like hags that mysteriously propel the story from the sidelines through rituals that alter the weather and, in turn, alter Manhog’s course". The pet names are taken from the characters Betty and Veronica from Archie comic books.

== Reception ==
The book was included on numerous "Best of 2010" lists, including:

- The 2010 Los Angeles Times Book Prize for Graphic Novels (as Finalist)
- Publishers Weekly's Best Books of 2010
- Douglas Wolk's Best Graphic Novels of 2010 at TIME.com – Techland (ranked #6)

== Foreign editions ==
Translations
Language	Title	Publisher	Date	ISBN
Dutch	Weersomstandigheden	De Bezige Bij	November 2009	978-9-054-92275-9
Norwegian	Værverk	Jippi Forlag	November 2009	978-8-292-22623-0
French	Weathercraft	l'Association	2010-01-09	978-2-844-14390-7
Italian	Weathercraft	Coconino Press	July 2010	978-8-876-18169-6
Czech	Mrakobití	Trystero	2018	978-80-906058-3-1

== See also ==
- Alternative comics
- Graphic novel
