= Mark Martin (cartoonist) =

American cartoonist (born 1956)

- Born: January 21, 1956 (age 70)
- Area: Cartoonist
- Notable works: Gnatrat, Teenage Mutant Ninja Turtles

Mark Martin (born January 21, 1956) is an American cartoonist known for lighthearted humor and satire. He grew up in Leeds, Alabama.

== Career ==
Martin's first major work in the 1980s was Gnatrat, a parody of Batman, featuring a rat who dresses as a gnat to fight crime. He went on to work on the Teenage Mutant Ninja Turtles series, and created "20 Nude Dancers 20," a long-running humor strip featured in Comics Buyer's Guide.

As an editor, Martin created the anthology Hyena and briefly oversaw a humor section in Heavy Metal. He also edited the first edition of Scott McCloud's Understanding Comics.

Martin then moved toward working almost exclusively in children's comics, often for Nickelodeon's Nickelodeon Magazine, while producing other work for his website.

His collaborations with long-time friend Jim Woodring include the children's series Tantalizing Stories, and several minicomics featuring their characters Frank and Montgomery Wart.

Martin is often mistaken for the race-car driver Mark Martin; this is a frequent subject of his comics in recent years.

== Bibliography ==
- 1986 - Gnatrat - The Dark Gnat Returns
- 1986 - Happy Birthday Gnatrat
- 1987 - Darerat/Tadpole
- 1990 - The Ultimate Gnatrat
- 1990 - Gnatrat - The Movie
- 1990 - Eastman & Laird's Teenage Mutant Ninja Turtles The Collected Book Volume 5. Mirage
- 1991 - 20 Nude Dancers 20 Poster Book. Tundra.
- 1997 - Ultimate Gnatrat. Fantagraphics Books. ISBN 1-56097-027-8
- 2011 - Gnatrat Lives
