= Jim (comics) =

Comic book series

- Jim, Vol. II No. 2

Publication information
- Publisher: Fantagraphics Books
- Publication date: Sept 1987 – May 1996
- No. of issues: 4 (Vol. I); 6 (Vol. II)

Creative team
- Created by: Jim Woodring

Jim is a comic book series by Jim Woodring. It began in 1980 as a self-published zine and was picked up by Fantagraphics Books in 1986 after cartoonist Gil Kane introduced Woodring to Fantagraphics co-owner Gary Groth. The publisher released four magazine-sized black-and-white issues starting in September 1987. A comic book-sized continuation, Jim Volume II, with some color, began in 1993 and ran for six issues until 1996.

Jim, which Woodring described as an "autojournal", contained comics on a variety of subjects, many based on dreams, as well as surreal drawings and free-form text which resembled Jimantha automatic writing. Besides dreams, the work drew on Woodring's childhood experiences, hallucinations, past alcoholism, and Hindu beliefs. It also included stories of recurring Woodring characters such as Pulque (the embodiment of drunkenness), boyhood friends Chip and Monk, and, in Volume II, his signature creation Frank.

== Content ==
Jim is made up of a variety of short comics, text pieces, and artwork. Most of the works are short comics based on Woodring's dreams. Some of the pieces are surreal parodies of advertisements in the Mad tradition.

== Publication ==
The series began as a photocopied 12-page minicomic that Woodring self-published in 1980. The contents were drawn from Woodring's autojournal—a journal in which he recorded his dreams in comics, prose, drawings, and paintings. Fantagraphics Books co-owner Gary Groth began publishing the series; the four issues of the first volume ran from 1987 to 1990.

Most of the contents of the first volume were reprinted in the book collection The Book of Jim in 1993. A collection of both volumes appeared in 2014 under the title Jim, subtitled Jim Woodring's Notorious Autojournal.

=== Vol. I ===
1. (Sep. 1987)
2. (Jan. 1988)
3. (Jan. 1989)
4. (Oct. 1990)

=== Vol. II ===
1. (Dec. 1993)
  - Manhog Beyond the Face (color)
  - Quarry Story
2. (April 1994)
  - untitled Frank story (color)
  - untitled
  - untitled Pulque story (color)
  - untitled Big Red story
3. (July 1994)
  - untitled
  - Authorized Only (digital color)
  - The Reform of the Apple
4. (Dec. 1994, printed Nov. 1994)
  - Frank and the Toy without Pity
  - untitled Frank story (color)
  - Frank in the Cave of his Ancestors
5. (May 1995)
  - Dive Deep
  - Peeker (color)
  - The Stairs
  - Frank and the Sugar of Vengeance
  - Echo (inside back cover)
6. (May 1996, printed April 1996)
  - Obviously Not
  - untitled Chip and Monk story
  - Boyfriend of the Weather

== Reception ==
Comics critic Joe McCulloch stated, "What Woodring did better than anyone was promote the idea that the subconscious, the imaginary, and the dreamtime state were perfectly valid terrains for autobiographical exploration" at a time when the confessional work of Justin Green and the mundane stories of Harvey Pekar defined the range of autobiographical comics.

Jim ranked No. 71 on The Comics Journal's list of the hundred greatest English-language comics of the 20th century.
