= Brecht Evens =

Belgian comic book writer

- Born: 1986 (age 39–40) Hasselt, Belgium
- Area: Writer
- Notable works: The Wrong Place; The Making Of; Panther; The City of Belgium
- Awards: See below

Brecht Evens (born 1986) is a Belgian graphic novel artist and illustrator living in Paris. Several of his graphic novels have been translated into French, English, German, Spanish, Danish, Norwegian, Italian, Russian, Korean, Polish, Portuguese, Slovenian and Ukrainian and have received international acclaim. He also works for the press, fashion and art galleries and also extends his drawing work to animated films and lithography. Brecht Evens is known for his unique and bold drawing style, often described as playful, expressive and surreal. His colourful illustrations and painterly backgrounds create a dreamy and imaginative atmosphere. Evens uses dynamic lines and flowing shapes to bring his characters and landscapes to life. His figures often have abstract and distorted features, conveying a sense of movement and emotion. Overall, his work has an unconventional and experimental aesthetic that bears his own unique stamp; Evensism.

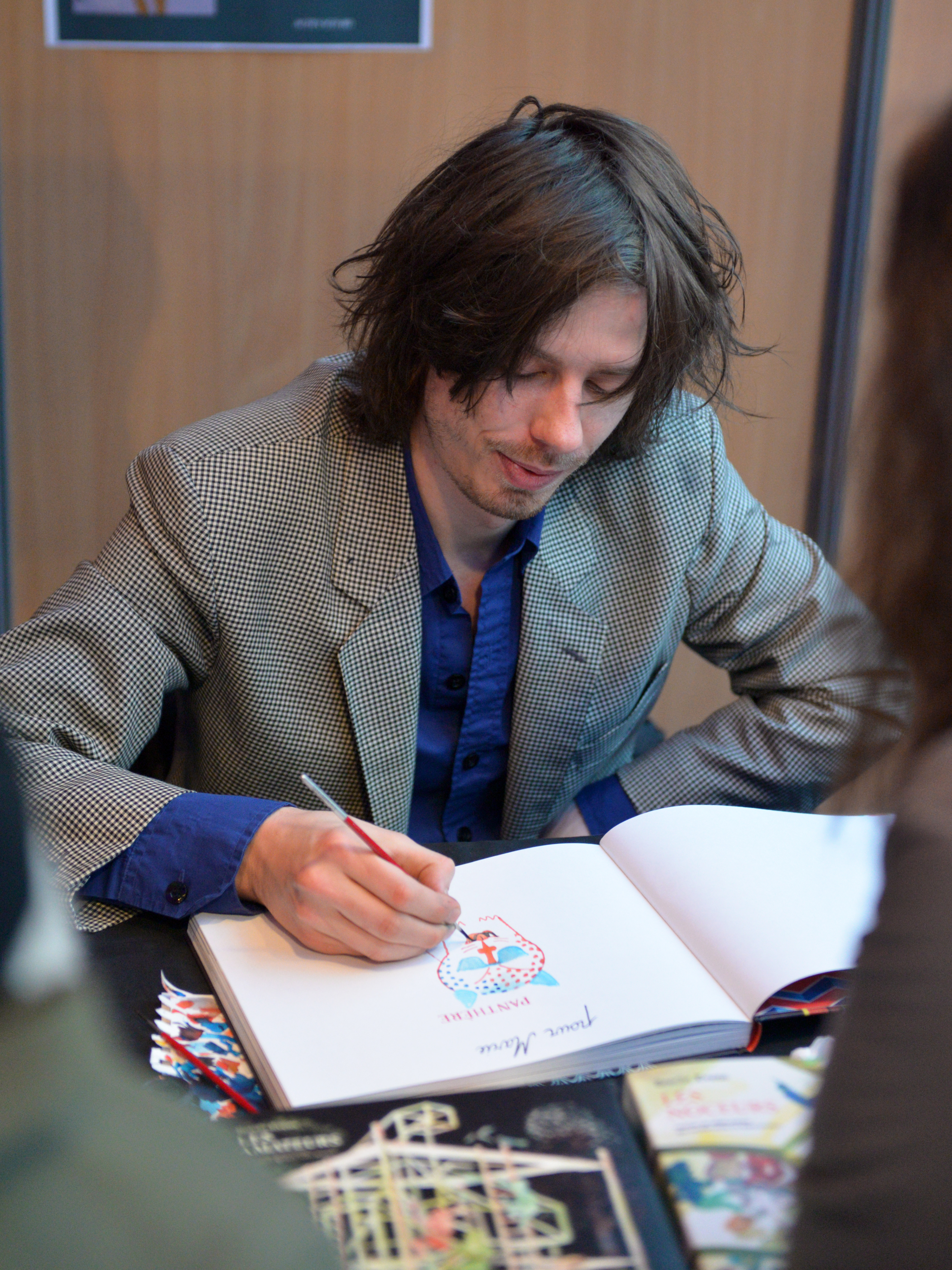
Belgian comics artist Brecht Evens at Angoulême International Comics Festival 2015

== Early life ==
Brecht graduated from Sint-Lucas Fine Arts in Ghent in 2008 with a specialization in Illustration.

== Career ==
At the age of 18 he saw his comic A Message From Space (original title Een Boodschap Uit De Ruimte) being published after winning a comic competition. One year later Vincent was published followed by Night Animals (original title Nachtdieren) two years later. 2009 saw his breakthrough when winning the first Willy Vandersteen prize and when nominated for a Will Eisner Comic Industry Award for "The Wrong Place" (Original title Ergens Waar Je Niet Wil Zijn). In 2011 "The Making Of" (Original title De Liefhebbers) was published, followed by Panther in 2014.

2016 saw the release of the Louis Vuitton Travel Book Paris, a book containing 100 paintings of Paris, the personal impressions of a 18 months stay in Paris commissioned by Louis Vuitton.

In 2018 his mural Jardin aux fleurs was installed in Brussels as a public artwork.

In 2021 his awarded comic Les Rigoles was released in English (The City of Belgium, Drawn&Quarterly).

Evens has lived in Paris since 2013.

== Awards ==
Evens's work has won him several awards in the comics industry, including the Prix de L’Audace at the Angoulême International Comics Festival for "The Wrong Place" in 2011 (also nominated for an Eisner Award) and in 2019 the Special Jury Prize at the Angoulême International Comics Festival for Les Rigoles (Translated in English: The City of Belgium, 2021). In 2024, Evens received the Bronzen Adhemar award.
