= Fell (comics) =

American comic book

- Cover to Fell #1, illustrated by Ben Templesmith, published by Image Comics

Publication information
- Publisher: Image Comics
- Schedule: Irregular
- Format: Ongoing series
- Genre: Crime
- Publication date: September 2005 – January 2008
- No. of issues: 9 (as of November 2017)

Creative team
- Written by: Warren Ellis
- Artist: Ben Templesmith

Fell is an American comic book, written by Warren Ellis, illustrated by Ben Templesmith, and published by Image Comics. It has received two Eisner Awards nominations, for Best New Series and Best Continuing Series.

It began publication in 2005 and has been on hiatus since 2008, awaiting the release of its tenth installment. In a 2013 interview, Templesmith stated, "There's one issue done and I could have it illustrated tomorrow and Image won't print it. They would want two or three more issues of script written in the can, because they're not going to release one issue of a monthly book once every two years." Ellis has also made statements online indicating that once the series does return it may be short lived, saying that they would like to finish "the intended final seven issues". In June 2021, Templesmith announced that he would be reteaming with Ellis to continue the series. That same month, Image Comics made a separate announcement stating that they would not be publishing the planned continuation in light of the recent sexual coercion/numerous affair-having allegations against Ellis.

== History ==
Each issue is also a self-contained story, supplemented with behind-the-scenes shots of unfinished artwork, a text section where the author expands the story's background, provides excerpts from the script, and (tentatively) answers reader e-mail. The series suffered from scheduling issues due to Warren Ellis' computer, which contained several future Fell scripts along with his backups, dying in late 2008, forcing Ellis to recreate them. Ellis announced on January 14, 2011, through his website, that the script to issue #10 had been emailed to Image Comics and Ben Templesmith.

== Story ==
Homicide detective Richard Fell is transferred from his old post across the bridge to Snowtown, a city rife with urban decay of America's worst inner cities and the poverty of a third-world country. At one point described as a "feral city," Snowtown's denizens are generally desperate, hostile, or both. Violence is commonplace, with whole chunks of the city devoid of proper utilities, services and basic amenities. So hopeless is the city that the citizenry have begun spraypainting giant S's that have been crossed out as a form of protective magic, in the hopes that Snowtown will not harm what has been labelled as its own. Having joined the "three and a half detectives" in the entirety of Snowtown (one having no legs), Fell is determined to do all he can to better the city in many ways. He takes calls on his time off, he ignores a lack of a warrant for the sake of a little girl and he pushes through efforts to hire more precinct employees. He is noted by his powers of observation and deduction (a salute to Sherlock Holmes) and his ever-present digital camera.

Snowtown is not without its share of mysteries, including its location, which is near a body of water somewhere. According to Lt. Beard, it is "miles from anywhere, [and] colder than Eskimo nipples." Also unclear are the reasons for Fell's transfer though it involves an injured partner with recurring memory loss. Fell's city setting is anonymous with Snowtown obviously being a mixture of many downtown areas.

Richard meets the owner of a bar, Mayko, who is a young woman of Vietnamese descent. While Richard is spending an evening at her apartment, Mayko brands him while she is drunk and under the influence of painkillers, burning the Snowtown emblem into his neck. Later she and Richard make up and start spending more time together.

An interesting minor character seen in passing throughout the series is the nun. She appears as a short, somewhat heavyset nun in a habit, wearing a Richard Nixon mask and having black eyes with tiny white pupils. Thus far, the nun has been seen buying ice cream, purchasing a handgun, hiring the services of a prostitute, and apparently robbing a beggar. Richard's thought on his second sighting of the nun: "I need to think of something to arrest her for." Ellis has yet to indicate the nun's place in the grand scheme of Snowtown, but indicates she is getting "more dangerous" at the end of an issue, referring to her purchasing a gun in the next issue.

== Collected editions ==
A trade paperback collecting the first eight issues appeared in April 2007.

- Fell, Feral City - collects issues 1-8 (152 pages, April 2007, ISBN 1-58240-693-6)

== Awards ==
- 2006 Eisner Award for Best Continuing Series
- 2006 Eisner Award for Best New Series
