= Jippi Comics =

Norwegian comics publisher

Jippi Comics is a Norwegian comics publisher, best known for their ongoing anthology "Forresten", and publishing the work of now famous Jason long before his international breakthrough.

Started and run by the comic creators themselves, Jippi has been a catalyst in the Norwegian comics scene since the early 1990s, giving unknown artists a chance to show off their work to each other and the general public. Among the hundreds of artists published by Jippi are: Jens Styve, Ronny Haugeland, Øystein Runde, Tor Ærlig, Martin Ernstsen, Inga Sætre, Jason, Sigbjørn Lilleeng, Roy Søbstad, Lene Ask, Odd Henning Skyllingstad, Kristian Hammerstad and Henry Bronken.
