= Batman: Gotham County Line =

Three-issue American comic book limited series by Steve Niles

Publication information
- Publisher: DC Comics
- Schedule: Monthly
- Format: Limited series
- Genre: Crime, horror, superhero
- Publication date: December 2005 – February 2006
- No. of issues: 3
- Main character(s): Batman; Deadman; Alfred Pennyworth

Creative team
- Written by: Steve Niles
- Artist: Scott Hampton
- Letterer: Pat Brosseau
- Colorist: Jose Villarrubia
- Editor(s): Joey Cavalieri; Michael Wright

Collected editions
- Batman: Gotham County Line: ISBN 1-4012-0905-X

Batman: Gotham County Line is a three-issue American comic book limited series written by Steve Niles, known for his series 30 Days of Night, and illustrated by Scott Hampton. It follows Batman as a series of ritual murders outside Gotham City leads him into a macabre supernatural realm.

This three-issue run was the first collaboration between Steve Niles and Scott Hampton, but it would not be their last. The following year they worked together again to release their original graphic novel series Simon Dark.

== Plot ==
During a fight with Batman, the Joker raises the issue of the existence of an afterlife, which Batman puts down, along with his nemesis. Jim Gordon summons Batman with a case in the suburbs of Gotham County, where entire families have been killed in the same grisly and ritualistic way, shortly after being robbed by a junkie. Batman investigates one of the crime scenes before being called to another murder in progress where he pursues the killer but is ambushed and knocked out. He is rescued by detectives Keith and Radmuller of the Gotham County Sheriff's Department and questions the junkie thief at his residence. Before the thief can give any information, he is shot by the killer who eludes Batman again, but not before Batman procures a Sheriff's badge from his person, that of Detective Radmuller. Batman arrives at Radmuller's apartment to apprehend him, but Radmuller has set a trap causing Batman to inadvertently hang him by opening the door. The case is solved and Batman returns to Gotham, but Radmuller springs to life in the back of the ambulance transporting his corpse, killing those inside and leading their reanimated corpses back into town.

Bruce is haunted by dreams and visions of reanimated corpses and his parents blaming him for their deaths. He suspects Radmuller of poisoning him with something, though his tests for such come back negative. Detective Keith contacts him to inform him that Radmuller's body is missing, along with those of the most recently murdered family. At the crime scene, Batman and Keith are accosted by the corpse of the murdered father, who shoots Keith with her own gun and flees. Deadman emerges from Keith's body and informs Batman that he is trapped in a world between that of the living and the dead, having been cursed by Radmuller before his death. Deadman tells Batman that he must open his mind if he is to escape the realm and lets slip that he is aware of Batman's secret identity, before they are accosted by a horde of zombies led by Radmuller and Deadman disappears.

Batman attempts to fight the zombies off, but they are immune to his struggles. Radmuller explains that they are the victims of crimes that Batman failed to stop. Batman flees and is saved by the zombie of Jason Todd, who thanks Batman for thinking of him. Batman takes shelter in a decrepit house, where he sees the corpses of Radmuller's parents, who tell Batman how their son killed them just to watch them die. Deadman reappears with the Phantom Stranger, who destroys the attacking zombies. Batman goes to confront Radmuller, on the way meeting his parents, who ask him to believe in something beyond their violent deaths and inspiring Batman to confront Radmuller with his own dead parents. Radmuller's power over the realm dissipates and Batman returns to the moment before the curse was enacted, stopping Radmuller's hanging death and turning him over to the GCSD.

== Collected editions ==
The limited series has been collected in a trade paperback:

- Batman: Gotham County Line (180 pages, October 2006, ISBN 140120905X)

== Reception ==
The List called the comic "interesting but not essential".

The Slings & Arrows described the book as "three-quarters of a very good Batman book".
