= Kyle Hotz =

American comic book artist and writer

- Areas: Writer, Penciller, Inker

Kyle Hotz is an American comic book artist and writer. His work has appeared in series published by Marvel Comics, DC Comics and Dark Horse Comics.

== Comics career ==
Hotz graduated with a bachelor's degree in fine arts in 1993. While still in the final year he started working as a comic book artist on horror titles such as Slash and Cold Blooded. After finishing school he was hired by Malibu Comics (later acquired by Marvel Comics) to illustrate the superhero comic Night Man. He was soon noticed by Marvel, who employed him on titles such as Doctor Strange, Ghost Rider 2099 and two Carnage one-shots. He went on to draw most of the popular Marvel characters, such as Spider-Man, Hulk, Captain America and Venom. In 2000 he co-created the Marvel supervillain The Hood with writer Brian K. Vaughan and illustrated two eponymous series.

In parallel with his Marvel work, Hotz drew several mini-series for independent publishers such as Dark Horse Comics and IDW Publishing. He co-created Epilogue with writer Steve Niles, illustrated The Agency, and both wrote and illustrated the creator-owned graphic novel Mosaic for Sirius Entertainment. He collaborated with writer Eric Powell (of The Goon fame) on three 4-issue series featuring a fictional version of legendary outlaw Billy the Kid, under the common title of Billy the Kid's Old Timey Oddities.

In October 2026, Hotz was announced as the artist of a DC Elseworlds limited series titled Green Lantern: Doomed Cosmos, a military science fiction story starring Hal Jordan.

== Influences ==
Hotz has said to be influenced by the works of Kelley Jones (an artist to whom he is often compared), Armando Gil, Michael Golden, Bernie Wrightson, Jack Davis, Moebius and Nestor Redondo. In addition to them he has also expressed admiration for Eric Powell (with whom he collaborated several times), Tony Moore, James O'Barr and Simon Bisley.

== Bibliography ==
=== DC Comics ===
- Detective Comics #1006–1007 (art, with writer Pete Tomasi, 2019)
- Tales from the Dark Multiverse: Blackest Night #1 (art, with writer Tim Seeley, 2019)
- Justice League Dark #20, 23 (art, with writers Ram V and James Tynion IV, 2020)

=== Marvel Comics ===
- Ghost Rider 2099 #6–8, 10–12 (art, with writer Len Kaminski, 1994–95)
- Venom: Super Special one-shot (art, with writer David Michelinie, 1995)
- Carnage: Mind Bomb #1 (art, with writer Warren Ellis, 1996)
- Carnage: It's a Wonderful Life #1 (art, with writer David Quinn, 1996)
- Spider-Man: The Osborn Journal #1 (art, with writer Glenn Greenberg, 1997)
- The Incredible Hulk #21-23, 26, 29 (art, with writers Paul Jenkins and Fabian Nicieza, 2000-01)
- The Hood #1–6 (art, with writer Brian K. Vaughan, 2002)
- Captain Marvel #7–8 (art, with writer Peter David, 2003)
- Agent X #12 (art, with writer Gail Simone, 2003)
- Man-Thing #1–3 (art, with writer Hans Rodionoff, 2004)
- Black Panther 2099 #1 (art, with writer Robert Kirkman, 2004)
- Punisher: Silent Night #1 (art, with writer Andy Diggle, 2005)
- Zombie #1–4 (art, with writer Mike Raicht, 2006–07)
- Annihilation: Conquest - Wraith #1–4 (art, with writer Javier Grillo-Marxuach, 2007)
- The Zombie: Simon Garth #1–4 (art and script, with co-writer Eric Powell, 2008)
- Dark Reign: The Hood #1–5 (art, with writer Jeff Parker, 2009)
- Spider-Island: Heroes for Hire #1 (art, with writers Dan Abnett and Andy Lanning, 2011)
- Web of Venom: Venom Unleashed #1 (art, with writer Ryan Stegman, 2019)
- Immortal Hulk #14 (art, with writer Al Ewing, 2019)
- The Amazing Spider-Man #14 (art, with writer Zeb Wells, 2023)

=== Other publishers ===
- Cold Blooded: The Burning Kiss #1 (art, with writers Rafael Nieves and Frank Gomez, Northstar, 1993)
- The Night Man #4–10 (art, with writer Steve Englehart, Malibu Comics,1993)
- Curse of Rune #1–3 (art, with writer Chris Ulm, Malibu Comics,1995)
- Evil Ernie: Destroyer #1–9 (art, with writer Brian Pulido, Chaos! Comics, 1997–98)
- Mosaic #1–6 (art and script, Sirius Entertainment, 1999)
- The Agency #1–6 (art, with writer Paul Jenkins, Top Cow Productions, 2001–02)
- Billy the Kid's Old Timey Oddities (art, with writer Eric Powell, Dark Horse Comics, 2005)
- Criminal Macabre: Feat of Clay #1 (art, with writer Steve Niles, Dark Horse Comics, 2006)
- Criminal Macabre: Two Red Eyes #1–4 (art, with writer Steve Niles, Dark Horse Comics, 2006–7)
- Epilogue #1–4 (art, with writer Steve Niles, Dark Horse Comics, 2008)
- Billy the Kid's Old Timey Oddities and the Ghastly Fiend of London (art, with writer Eric Powell, Dark Horse Comics, 2010)
- Ghostbusters: Infestation #1–2 (art, with writer Erik Burnham, IDW Publishing, 2011)
- Billy the Kid's Old Timey Oddities and the Orm of Loch Ness (art, with writer Eric Powell, Dark Horse Comics, 2012–13)
