= Criminal Macabre: A Cal McDonald Mystery =

Comic book series

Criminal Macabre
- Cover of Criminal Macabre: A Cal McDonald Mystery (2003), trade paperback collected edition, art by Ben Templesmith
- First appearance: "Big Head" (1990)
- Created by: Steve Niles

Publication information
- Publisher: Dark Horse Comics; Image Comics
- Schedule: Monthly
Title(s)
"Big Head"
"Hairball"
Criminal Macabre: A Cal McDonald Mystery
Last Train To Deadsville: A Cal Mcdonald Mystery
Love Me Tenderloin: A Cal McDonald Mystery
Supernatural Freak Machine: A Cal McDonald Mystery
Criminal Macabre: Two Red Eyes
Criminal Macabre: Feat of Clay
Criminal Macabre: My Demon Baby
Criminal Macabre: Cell Block 666
- Formats: Original material for the series has been published as a strip in the comics anthology(s) Fly in My Eye and Dark Horse Presents and a set of limited series and one-shot comics.
- Genre: Horror
- Publication date: 1990 – Ongoing
- Main character(s): Cal McDonald

Creative team
- Writer(s): Steve Niles
- Artist(s): Jim Whiting; Ben Templesmith; Kelley Jones; Kyle Hotz; Nick Stakal

Reprints
- Collected editions
- Criminal Macabre: ISBN 1-56971-935-7
- Last Train to Deadsville: ISBN 1-5930-7107-8

Criminal Macabre: A Cal McDonald Mystery is a comic book series starring Cal McDonald, an antihero American comic book character created in 1990 by writer Steve Niles. The character's adventures have been published by Dark Horse Comics and later IDW Publishing.

Cal himself is akin to John Constantine, a DC Comics paranormal detective. He takes illicit drugs, and befriends a network of ghouls to assist him with his cases. Police do not really care to be involved with Cal.

== Publishing history ==
Cal McDonald's first story, entitled "Big-Head", was released in 1990 as part of the anthology comic Fly in My Eye: Daughters of Fly In My Eye from Arcane Comix, with art by Jim Whiting. That story led directly to the four-part "Hairball", serialized in Dark Horse Presents #102-105 in 1996. Hairball was later printed as a one-shot comic.

Cal's subsequent appearances were in two 2002 novels, Savage Membrane, and Guns, Drugs and Monsters. In the latter, Cal relocated to Los Angeles, after following a living, severed head searching for its body.

Following the novels, Cal made his return to comic book form in the Dark Horse Comics mini-series, Criminal Macabre (2003) with Ben Templesmith as artist. The two would pair up again for a one-shot comic titled "Love Me Tenderloin" in 2004. Cal's adventures have continued in other mini-series such as "Last Train to Deadsville" and "Supernatural Freak Machine", both with artist Kelley Jones, where he re-encountered the severed head. Next, he starred in the mini-series "Two Red Eyes" with artist Kyle Hotz, where he does battle with the vampire Nosferatu. He also made a brief appearance in short story format in the Dark Horse Comics released title Drawing on your Nightmares, again with Ben Templesmith as artist. From there, he went on to do "My Demon Baby" and "Cell Block 666" with artist Nick Stakal. The series "Two Red Eyes" started a trend continuing in "My Demon Baby", where action film actor Thomas Jane would portray Cal on the issue's covers, stylized by artist Tim Bradstreet.

During the release of some of the comic book series there was another novel released in 2003 titled Dial M for Monster: A Cal McDonald Collection. This novel included several short stories featuring Cal.

Criminal Macabre: The Complete Cal McDonald Stories collects the entire catalogue of Cal McDonald short stories (not the comic stories) until this point. It was released on December 26 of 2007.

== Series titles ==
- Hairball (IDW one-shot, collected from Dark Horse Presents v1 102–105)
- Criminal Macabre (Dark Horse 5-issue mini-series, 2003)
- Love Me Tenderloin (Dark Horse one-shot, Criminal Macabre 6)
- Drawing on your Nightmares (Dark Horse short story entitled Letter From B.S.)
- Last Train to Deadsville (Dark Horse 4-issue mini-series, 2004)
- Supernatural Freak Machine (IDW published 1–3; Dark Horse included issues 4 and 5 in the Criminal Macabre Omnibus Vol. 1 and the Supernatural Freak Machine collection)
- Feat of Clay (Dark Horse one-shot, 2006)
- Two Red Eyes (Dark Horse 4-issue mini-series, 2007)
- My Demon Baby (Dark Horse 4-issue mini-series, 2008)
- Cell Block 666 (Dark Horse 4-issue mini-series, 2009)
- Call Me Monster (Dark Horse FCBD 2011 one-shot)
- When Freaks Collide (Dark Horse one-shot crossover with The Goon)
- No Peace for Dead Men (Dark Horse one-shot, 2011)
- Die, Die, My Darling! (Dark Horse one-shot, collected from Dark Horse Presents v2 4–6, 2012)
- Final Night (Dark Horse 4-issue crossover with 30 Days of Night)
- They Fight by Night (Dark Horse one-shot, 2012)
- The Iron Spirit (Dark Horse oversized deluxe hardcover one-shot, 2012)
- The Eyes of Frankenstein (Dark Horse 4-issue mini-series, 2013)
- The Third Child (Dark Horse 4-issue mini-series, 2014)
- The Big Bleed Out (Dark Horse 4-issue mini-series, 2019)
- Spirit of the Demon (Dark Horse graphic novel, 2022)

== Collected editions ==
The series has been collected into a number of trade paperbacks:

Title	Artist	ISBN	Collects
Criminal Macabre	Ben Templesmith	ISBN 1-56971-935-7	Issues 1–5
Last Train to Deadsville	Kelley Jones	ISBN 1-59307-107-8	Last Train To Deadsville 1–4 (Criminal Macabre 7–10)
Supernatural Freak Machine	Kelley Jones	ISBN 1-59307-731-9	Supernatural Freak Machine 1–5 (Criminal Macabre 11–15)
Two Red Eyes	Kyle Hotz	ISBN 1-59307-843-9	Two Red Eyes 1–4 (Criminal Macabre 17–20)
My Demon Baby	Nick Stakal	ISBN 1-59307-908-7	My Demon Baby 1–4 (Criminal Macabre 21–24)
Cell Block 666	Nick Stakal	ISBN 1-59307-908-7	Cell Block 666 1–4 (Criminal Macabre 25–28)
Omnibus Vol. 1	Ben Templesmith and Kelley Jones	ISBN 1-59582-746-3	Issues 1–5, Letter From B.S., Love Me Tenderloin, Last Train to Deadville 1–4, Supernatural Freak Machine 1–5
Omnibus Vol. 2	Casey Jones, Kyle Hotz and Nick Stakal	ISBN 1-59582-746-3	Two Red Eyes 1–4, My Demon Baby 1–4, Cell Block 666 1–4, Feat of Clay, The Creepy Tree, The Trouble With Brains, Hairball
Omnibus Vol. 3	Scott Morse and Christopher Mitten	ISBN 978-1-61655-648-8	Final Night: The 30 Days Of Night Crossover 1–4, The Eyes Of Frankenstein 1–4, The Iron Spirit, Call Me Monster, When Freaks Collide, No Peace For Dead Men, Die! Die! My Darling, They Fight By Night

== In other media ==
=== Novels ===
Title	Publisher	ISBN	Release date
Savage Membrane	Idea & Design Works	ISBN 978-0-9712282-3-8	April 2002
Guns, Drugs & Monsters	Idea & Design Works	ISBN 978-0-9719775-2-5	February 2005
Dial M For Monster	Idea & Design Works	ISBN 1-932382-05-4	September 2003
Criminal Macabre: The Complete Cal McDonald Stories	Dark Horse Books	ISBN 1-59582-118-X	December 2007

=== Film ===
In 2010, a Cal McDonald film was said to be on the way, however Steve Niles did not want to compromise or "water down" Cal McDonald, and this made it a challenge to find a studio that would finance the film.

Universal Pictures signed a deal to produce a Criminal Macabre movie with Kyle Ward scripting. It was set for release in 2010.
