= Scott Ciencin =

American novelist (1962–2014)

- Ciencin, c. 2008
- Born: September 1, 1962
- Died: August 5, 2014 (aged 51)
- Occupation: Novelist
- Writing career
- Genres: Children's, fantasy, horror

Malcolm Scott Ciencin (September 1, 1962 – August 5, 2014) was an American author of adult and children's fiction. He co-authored several books with his wife Denise Ciencin. He was a New York Times bestselling author who wrote works in a variety of mediums including comic books.

== Career ==
Among his works are novels written for the Dungeons & Dragons role playing game campaign settings. He also wrote books for the Dinotopia series. was a New York Times bestselling novelist of 90+ books from Simon & Schuster, Random House, Scholastic, Harper and many more. He had also written comic books, screenplays, and worked on video games. He created programs for Scholastic Books, designed trading cards, consulted on video games, directed and produced audio programs & TV commercials, and wrote in the medical field about neurosurgery and neurology. He first worked in TV production as a writer, producer and director.

== Personal life ==
Ciencin lived in Sarasota, Florida with his wife (and sometimes co-author) Denise. He died in August 2014 of a blood clot to the brain.

== Bibliography ==
=== Forgotten Realms ===
==== The Avatar Series ====
Originally published under the pseudonym Richard Awlinson. Ciencin shared the pseudonym with Troy Denning, who wrote part 3 of the Avatar Series "Waterdeep," and James Lowder who edited the trilogy and wrote parts of "Tantras."

- Shadowdale, (1989) ISBN 978-0-7869-3105-7
- Tantras, (1989) ISBN 978-0-7869-3108-8

==== The Harpers ====
- The Night Parade, (1992) ISBN 978-1-56076-323-9

=== Robert Silverberg's Time Tours ===
Published under the pseudonym Nick Baron.

- Glory's End, (1990) ISBN 978-0-06-106013-7
- The Pirate Paradox, (1991) ISBN 978-0-06-106016-8, with Greg Cox

=== The Wolves of Autumn ===
- The Wolves of Autumn, (1992) ISBN 978-0-446-36248-1
- The Lotus and the Rose, (1992) ISBN 978-0-446-36249-8

=== The Vampire Odyssey ===
- The Vampire Odyssey, (1992) ISBN 978-0-8217-3853-5
- The Wildlings, (1992) ISBN 978-0-8217-3934-1
- Parliament of Blood, (1992) ISBN 978-0-8217-3995-2

=== The Nightmare Club ===
Published under the pseudonym Nick Baron.

- The Initiation, (1993) ISBN 978-0-8217-4316-4
- The Mask, (1993) ISBN 978-0-8217-4349-2
- Slay Ride, (1993) ISBN 978-0-8217-4419-2
- Spring Break, (1994) ISBN 978-0-8217-4542-7

=== WildC.A.T.S, Covert Action Teams ===
- Dark Blade Falling, (1995) ISBN 978-0-679-87480-5
- Evil Within, (1995) ISBN 978-0-679-87481-2

=== Dinotopia ===
- Windchaser, (1995) ISBN 978-0-679-86981-8
- Lost City, (1996) ISBN 978-0-679-86983-2
- Sabertooth Mountain, (1996) ISBN 978-0-679-88095-0, with John Vornholt
- Thunderfalls, (1996) ISBN 978-0-679-88256-5
- Sky Dance, (1999) ISBN 978-0-679-80417-8
- Return to the Lost City, (2000) ISBN 978-0-375-81018-3
- The Explorers, (2001) ISBN 978-0-375-81396-2

=== The Elven Ways ===
- The Ways of Magic, (1996) ISBN 978-0-380-77980-2
- Ancient Games, (1997) ISBN 978-0-380-77981-9
- Night of Glory, (1998) ISBN 978-0-380-77983-3

=== The Lurker Files ===
- Faceless, (1996) ISBN 978-0-679-88235-0
- Know Fear, (1996) ISBN 978-0-679-88236-7
- Nemesis, (1997) ISBN 978-0-679-88506-1
- Incarnate, (1997) ISBN 978-0-679-88507-8
- Apparition, (1997) ISBN 978-0-679-88634-1
- Triad, (1997) ISBN 978-0-679-88635-8

=== Godzilla ===
- Godzilla, King of the Monsters, (1996) ISBN 978-0-679-88220-6
- Godzilla Invades America, (1997) ISBN 978-0-679-88752-2
- Godzilla: Journey to Monster Island, (1998) ISBN 978-0-679-88901-4
- Godzilla vs. the Space Monster, (1998) ISBN 978-0-679-88902-1

=== Dinoverse ===
- I Was A Teenage T-Rex, (1999) ISBN 978-0-679-88843-7, originally published as Dinoverse
- The Teens Time Forgot, (2000) ISBN 978-0-679-88844-4
- Raptor Without A Cause, (2000) ISBN 978-0-679-88845-1
- Please Don't Eat the Teacher, (2000) ISBN 978-0-679-88846-8
- Beverly Hills Brontosaurus, (2000) ISBN 978-0-375-80595-0
- Dinosaurs Ate My Homework, (2000) ISBN 978-0-375-80596-7

=== Gen^{13} ===
- Time and Chance, with Jeff Marriotte, (2001) ISBN 978-0-441-00856-8

=== Jurassic Park Adventures ===
Ciencin's Jurassic Park stories are original novels based on the Jurassic Park films rather than directly on Michael Crichton's work.

- Jurassic Park Adventures: Survivor, (2001) ISBN 978-0-375-81289-7
- Jurassic Park Adventures: Prey, (2001) ISBN 978-0-375-81290-3
- Jurassic Park Adventures: Flyers, (2002) ISBN 978-0-7434-7974-5

=== Buffyverse ===
- Sweet Sixteen (Buffy novel), (2001) ISBN 978-0-7434-4961-8
- Vengeance (Angel novel), (2002) ISBN 978-0-7434-4980-9, with Dan Jolley
- The Longest Night (Angel novel), (2002) ISBN 0-7434-5061-2, with Denise Ciencin
- Nemesis (Angel novel), (2003) ISBN 978-0-689-86702-6, with Denise Ciencin
- Mortal Fear (Buffy novel), (2003) ISBN 978-0-7434-2771-5, with Denise Ciencin

=== Starfleet Corps of Engineers ===
- Some Assembly Required, (2002) ISBN 978-0-7434-6442-0, with Greg Brodeur, Dave Galanter, Dan Jolley, Aaron Rosenberg, and Keith R.A. DeCandido
- Age of Unreason, (2003) ASIN B000FBJFHS
- Breakdowns, (2005) ISBN 978-1-4165-0326-2, with Keith R. A. DeCandido, Kevin Dilmore, Heather Jarman, and Dayton Ward

=== Transformers ===
- Hardwired, (2003) ISBN 978-0-7434-5898-6

=== Kim Possible ===
- Tweeb Trouble, (2004) ISBN 978-0-7868-4629-0

=== EverQuest ===
- The Rogue's Hour, (2004) ISBN 978-1-59315-294-9

=== Charmed ===
- Luck Be a Lady, (2004) ISBN 978-0-689-85793-5
- Light of the World, (2006) ISBN 978-1-4169-1470-9
- High Spirits, (2007) ISBN 978-1-4169-3668-8

=== Kim Possible: Pick a Villain ===
- Game On!, (2005) ISBN 978-0-7868-4652-8
- Masters of Mayhem, (2005) ISBN 978-0-7868-4689-4

=== Standalone novels ===
- Virtual Destruction, (1995) ISBN 978-0-8217-5010-0
- Jurassic Park 3, (2001) ISBN 978-0-375-89001-7
- Even Stevens: The Stevens Get Even, (2004) ISBN 978-0-7868-4708-2
- The Legend of Zorro, (2005) ISBN 978-0-06-083304-6

== Comic books and other works ==
Scott Ciencin also wrote comic books. His credits include

- A Winter's Tale - from Captain America: Red, White & Blue with art by Pasqual Ferry from Marvel
- Trial by Fire - mini-series with art by Ron Wagner set in R.A. Salvatore's Demonwars universe - from CrossGen
- Eye for an Eye - mini-series with art by Greg Tucchini set in R.A. Salvatore's Demonwars universe - from CrossGen
- Metropolis S.C.U. - with artist Roger Robinson from D.C.
- New Gods: A Shadow Over Eden - from D.C.
- New Gods: Acts of God - from D.C.
- Star Trek: The Next Generation: The Killing Shadows - mini-series from Wildstorm with art by Bryan Hitch and Andrew Currie
- Star Bus: Attack of the Cling-Ons, (2011) ISBN 978-1-4342-3067-6, with art by Jeff Crowther
- Silent Hill: Dying Inside - mini-series with art by Ben Templesmith and Aadi Salmon from IDW
- Silent Hill: Paint it Black - art by Shaun Thomas from IDW
- Silent Hill: Among the Damned - art by Shaun Thomas from IDW
- Silent Hill: The Grinning Man - art by Nick Stakal from IDW
- Silent Hill: Dead/Alive - mini-series with art by Nick Stakal from IDW
- Silent Hill: Three Bloody Tales - art by Nick Stakal, and Shaun Thomas from IDW

Original PSP Creation for Sony and Konami

- Silent Hill Experience: The Hunger
