= Silent Hill (comics) =

Comic book series

- Silent Hill: Dying Inside cover

Publication information
- Publisher: IDW Publishing
Title(s)
Dying Inside
Among the Damned
Paint it Black
The Grinning Man
Dead/Alive
Hunger
Sinner's Reward
Past Life
Anne's Story
- Formats: Original material for the series has been published as a set of limited series, graphic novels, and one-shot comics.
- Genre: Horror
- Publication date: Dying Inside; February 2004 - June 2004; Among the Damned; November 2004; Paint it Black; February 2005; The Grinning Man; May 2005; Dead/Alive; December 2005 - April 2006; Hunger; April 2006; Sinner's Reward; February 2008 - May 2008; Past Life; October 2010 - January 2011; Anne's Story; September 2014 - December 2014
- Number of issues: Dying Inside; 5 Among the Damned; 1 Paint it Black; 1 The Grinning Man; 1 Dead/Alive; 5 Sinner's Reward; 4 Past Life; 4 Anne's Story; 4

Creative team
- Writer(s): Dying Inside, Among The Damned, Paint It Black, The Grinning Man, Dead/Alive, Hunger; Scott Ciencin; Sinner's Reward, Past Life, Anne's Story; Tom Waltz
- Artist(s): Dying Inside; Ben Templesmith; Aadi Salman; Among the Damned/Paint it Black; Shaun Thomas; The Grinning Man/Dead/Alive; Nick Stakal; Hunger; Steve Perkins; Alex Shibao; Sinner's Reward; Steph Stamb; Past Life; Menton J. Matthews III; Anne's Story; Tristan Jones

Reprints
- Collected editions
- Dying Inside: ISBN 1-932382-24-0
- Three Bloody Tales: ISBN 1933239166
- Dead/Alive: ISBN 1933239948
- Sinner's Reward: ISBN 1600102387
- Omnibus: ISBN 1600102395

Silent Hill comics are a series of comic books additions to the Silent Hill franchise.

Apart from an unreleased graphic novel, Sinner's Reward, Past Life, and Anne's Story, they have all been written by Scott Ciencin, with various artists, and published by IDW Publishing.

== Stories ==
=== Silent Hill ===
An original unreleased Silent Hill graphic novel was completed in 1999 by comics publisher Com.X, but for an undisclosed reason the book was never published. Com.X and Konami have repeatedly officially stated that they still intend to publish the book, but no confirmed date has been set. IDW Publishing was unaware that this project existed when they pursued the license.

=== Dying Inside ===
Dying Inside was the first series published by IDW Publishing, with art by Ben Templesmith (#1 and 2) and Aadi Salman (#3 to 5).

This story was originally released as a five-issue limited series and later collected and released in a single volume trade paperback. The first two dealt with a doctor and patient, while the remaining three issues covered a group of goth kids. The first two issues rapidly sold out and required a second printing, in fact "Silent Hill #2 sold out, including IDW's overprinting, before it even shipped to stores."

In the first two chapters, Dr. Troy Abernathy wants to cure Lynn DeAngelis from her delusions, which began after she went to do a movie in the town of Silent Hill. Abernathy takes her back to the town... only to discover a world built from his inner fears, and ruled by a demonic little girl—Christabella—who seeks guilty souls. From Chapter 3 until the conclusion, a goth girl named Lauryn finds Lynn's movie and plans to go to Silent Hill supposedly to do the same stunt so her group can earn some cash. However, she actually wants to subdue Christabella, who is her sister who was killed due to her negligence. The Silent Hill film by Christophe Gans introduces a villain character by the name of Christabella.

=== Among the Damned ===
Among the Damned was a stand-alone one-shot story published in 2004 with art by Shaun Thomas. It is collected in the Silent Hill: Three Bloody Tales trade paperback.

=== Paint It Black ===
Paint It Black was another one-shot with art by Shaun Thomas from 2005, also collected in Three Bloody Tales.

It follows the story of Ike Isaacs, an artist who finds himself homeless after being kicked out of a friend's apartment. Ike remains under the influence of Artist's Block until he meets a stranger who claims to have visited the ghost town of Silent Hill. The stranger informs Ike that he was able to leave the town because his own friend sacrificed himself, this story inspires Ike to travel to the town to seek out the truth behind it.

Inspired, Ike is able to paint again; however his portraits now feature the creatures that live in the town, and he has found that he is unable to leave. The story then takes an unusual turn as a team of cheerleaders arrive in Silent Hill after their bus breaks down outside of the town.

As the plot continues to follow a strange set of developments, Ike discovers that he can actually travel through his paintings and he attempts to use them to escape.

His escape attempt fails and he finds that the cheerleaders have turned on him, sacrificing him so they can leave town.

=== The Grinning Man ===
The Grinning Man (2005) is the third one-shot collected in Three Bloody Tales with art by Nick Stakal.

State Trooper Robert Tower is on his last day of work before retirement when his new replacement, Mayberry, arrives. Despite the fact that Tower enters Silent Hill on a regular basis to look for missing people, he's never been exposed to the horrifying creatures that roam its streets. However, to play a prank on Mayberry (a firm believer in not only the lore of Silent Hill, but also several other conspiracy theories and supernatural concepts), he stages a "Monster" attack with two other officers. However, there is a new force in the town of Silent Hill—a smiling madman with a mastery of both magical spells and firearms who considers the city his own personal hunting ground. The truth about the city is exposed to Tower and the showdown between him and the mysterious Grinning Man ensues. This story is collected in the Silent Hill: Three Bloody Tales trade paperback.

=== Dead/Alive ===
Dead/Alive (2006) consists of five issues drawn by Nick Stakal.

Dead/Alive links to the Dying Inside series by returning to Dr. Abernathy, Lauryn and her sister Christabella. Lauryn has a new boyfriend which appears to be Ike, the protagonist of Paint It Black. Somehow, Christabella manages to escape Lauryn's powers, but returns as a normal little girl with little power. Then, she meets with a witch called Lenora who makes a deal with her. Lenora wants to bring Hell on earth through the characters of Connie and her ex-boyfriend actor Kenneth Carter.

=== Hunger ===
Hunger (2006) appears exclusively on UMD disc 'Silent Hill Experience'. Hunger concerns itself with Douglass Payne and his fiancé Rosy, recently transported to the idyllic, serene Silent Hill. Doug's hit on hard times, ousted from a prominent editorial position at a big newspaper where he was on track to deliver some huge stories before his ego got in the way and he was kicked to the curb. Now, settling down in Silent Hill, as his bride-to-be falls in love with the place, Doug is consumed with finding the next big story to get him back on top. When a 911 call is made to an abandoned house and the responding officer is murdered, reporter Douglas must find the answers to the mystery, all the while trying to find his love Rosy and figuring out the secrets that lie within a new stranger in town.

=== Sinner's Reward ===
Published by IDW Publishing in 2008. Written by Tom Waltz with art by Steph Stamb. When hitman Jack “The Pup” Stanton runs away with his mob boss's wife, he thinks he's finally put his murderous past behind him. Instead, Jack and his lover take a wrong turn into Silent Hill and quickly learn that some sins are impossible to escape.

=== Past Life ===
Written by Tom Waltz, Past life is a four issue Silent Hill comic published by IDW. The story chronicles events going back to 1867 and features a criminal gunslinger called Jebediah “Hellrider” Foster and his spouse Esther Monroe moving in to Silent Hill where they are haunted by their past.

=== Anne's Story ===
Anne's Story is a four-issue Silent Hill comic published by IDW. The story is based on the game Silent Hill: Downpour and is credited by IGN as being "the first comic to be a direct offshoot of the games rather than a standalone addition to the franchise's mythology." The story follows Anne, a security guard that is given permission to oversee the transfer of prisoners, most notably Murphy Pendleton, whom she blames for her father's death.

== Collected editions ==
A number of the stories have been collected into trade paperbacks:

- Silent Hill:
  - Volume 1: Dying Inside (collects the limited series, 128 pages, IDW publishing, September 2004, ISBN 1-932382-24-0)
  - Volume 2: Three Bloody Tales (collects Among the Damned, Paint it Black and The Grinning Man, 152 pages, IDW Publishing, October 2005, ISBN 1-933239-16-6)
  - Volume 3: Dead/Alive (144 pages, IDW Publishing, August 2, 2006, ISBN 1-933239-94-8)
  - Volume 4: Sinner's Reward (104 pages, IDW Publishing, September 2008, ISBN 1-60010-238-7)

The Silent Hill Omnibus was published by IDW in September 2008 and collected together the contents of the first three trades into a single, 432 page volume (ISBN 1600102395).
