= Scott Hampton =

American comic book artist (born 1959)

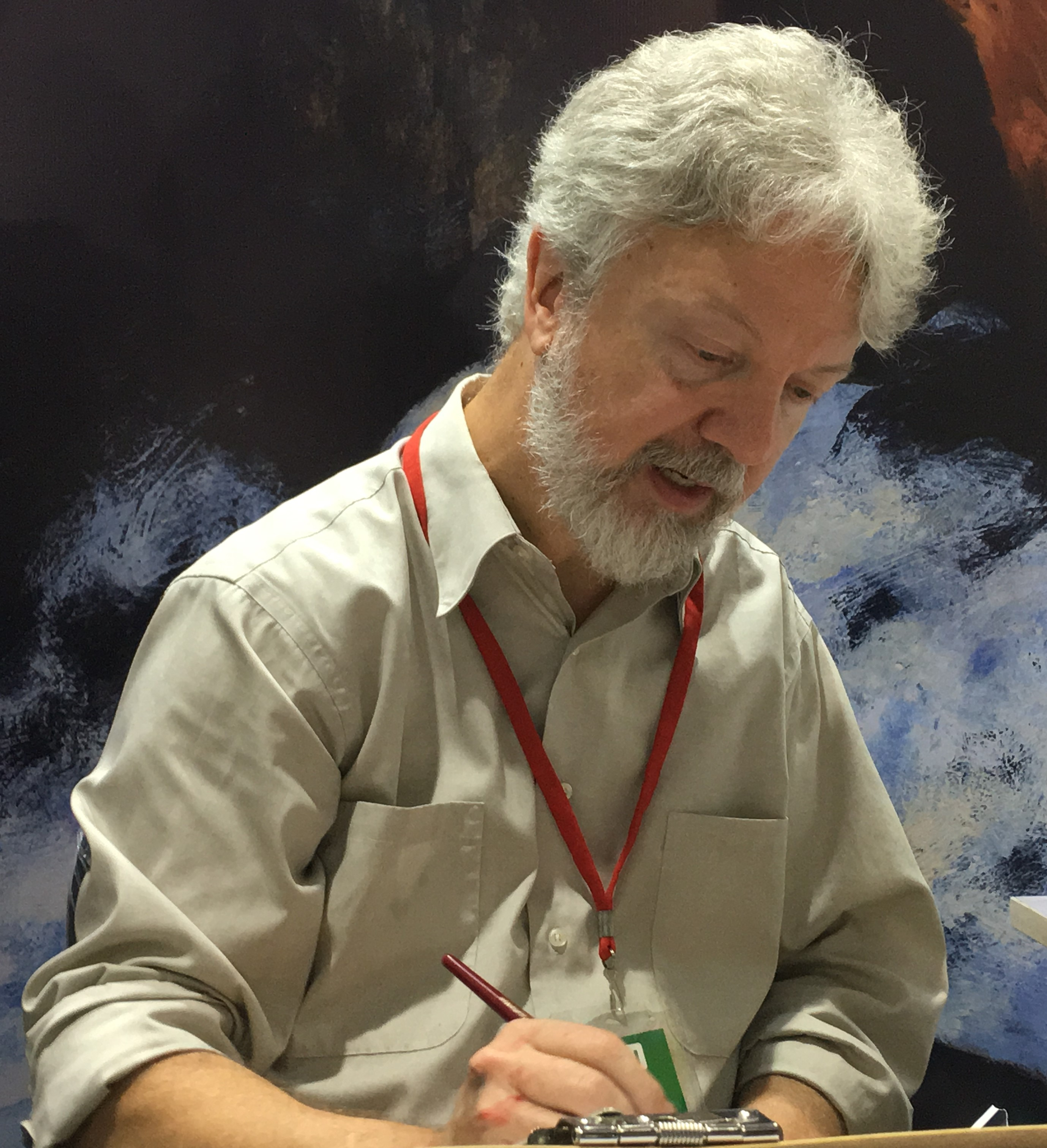
- Scott Hampton at 2017 Bangalore ComicCon
- Born: April 10, 1959 (age 67) High Point, North Carolina
- Areas: Writer, Penciller, Inker, Colourist
- Notable works: Silverheels; Simon Dark

Scott Hampton (born April 10, 1959) is an American comic book artist known for his painted artwork. He is the brother of fellow comics-creator Bo Hampton.

== Early life ==
Scott Hampton was born in 1959 in High Point, North Carolina.

== Career ==
Hampton began his career following in the footsteps of brother and fellow comic book creator Bo Hampton. Both Scott and Bo studied under Will Eisner in 1976. Scott's first professional comics work was the three-page story "Victims" published in Warren Publishing's Vampirella #101 in 1981. Scott's work on Silverheels from Pacific Comics in 1983 is regarded as the first continuing painted comic (of U.S. origin).

Working as a freelance comic book artist, Hampton has illustrated such iconic properties as Batman, Sandman, Black Widow, Hellraiser, and Star Trek in addition to work on his creator-owned projects such as The Upturned Stone.

His works include Spookhouse, released in 2004 by IDW Publishing, in which he adapted his favorite ghost stories into sequential form, and Batman: Gotham County Line from DC Comics in 2005. Hampton worked on the creator-owned series Simon Dark with writer Steve Niles for DC Comics.

Hampton has illustrated cards for the Magic: The Gathering collectible card game.

"The Upturned Stone" was optioned mid-2005 for film production by David Foster Productions, but the studio lost the option and the story was recently optioned by another producer. Scott is also pursuing a passion outside of comics: filmmaking. He completed his first short independent film, The Tontine, in April 2006. It's his loose adaptation of a 21-page comic piece that he worked on and appeared by the same name in the Hellraiser comic series. The 29-minute film was shot at the same cabin used in Eli Roth's Cabin Fever. The complete short can be found on IMDb as well as versions of it available to view on Myspace (partial), Google Video (full), and YouTube (split into 3 parts).

Hampton had also adapted Gregory Maguire's Wicked into a two-volume authorized graphic novel.

== Personal life ==
Hampton lives with his wife Letitia in Chapel Hill, North Carolina.

== Bibliography ==
Interior comics work includes:

- Wicked: The Graphic Novel Part I - volume 1 of a comics adaptation of Gregory Maguire's Wicked (March 2025)
- American Gods: The Moment of the Storm (with P. Craig Russell) - volume 3 of a three-part comics adaptation of Neil Gaiman's American Gods (June 2020)
- American Gods: My Ainsel (with P. Craig Russell) - volume 2 of a three-part comics adaptation of Neil Gaiman's American Gods (April 2019)
- American Gods: Shadows (with P. Craig Russell) - volume 1 of a three-part comics adaptation of Neil Gaiman's American Gods (March 2018)
- G.I. Zombie: A Star-Spangled War Story Vol. 1 (Star Spangled War Stories) (2014–2015)
- JSA 80-Page Giant (DC Comics, 2010)
- Simon Dark #1-18 (with Steve Niles, ongoing series, DC Comics, December 2007 - May 2009)
- Sky Horizon: Colony High book 1 (with David Brin, Subterranean Press, 2007)
- Shadowpact #13 (DC Comics, 2006)
- Batman: Gotham County Line #1-3 (with Steve Niles, 3-issue mini-series, DC Comics, 2005)
- Solo #9 (DC Comics, 2004)
- Black Widow: Breakdown #1-3 (with Greg Rucka, Marvel Comics, 2001)
- Sandman Presents: Lucifer (with Mike Carey, 3-issue mini-series, Vertigo, March–May 1999)
- Gen13: Bootleg #7 (Image Comics, 1997)
- Batman: Night Cries (script and art, with co-author Archie Goodwin, 96 page graphic novel, DC Comics, hardcover, 1992, ISBN 1-56389-059-3, softcover, 1993, ISBN 1-56389-066-6)
- Silverheels (with writers April Campbell/Bruce Jones, 4-issue mini-series but only 3 were published, Pacific Comics, December 1983 - May 1984)

== Awards ==
- 1993: Won "Special Award for Excellence in Presentation" Harvey Award, for Batman: Night Cries
