= Billy the Kid's Old Timey Oddities =

- Cover to issue #1; Art by Eric Powell

Publication information
- Publisher: Dark Horse Comics
- Schedule: Monthly
- Format: Limited series
- Publication date: April 2005 - July 2005
- No. of issues: Four
- Main character: Billy the Kid

Creative team
- Written by: Eric Powell
- Penciller: Kyle Hotz
- Inker: Kyle Hotz
- Colorist: Eric Powell

Billy the Kid's Old Timey Oddities is a four issue American comic book limited series published in 2005, by Dark Horse Comics. The series stars a fictional version of Billy the Kid, still alive in the year 1881 after the real life Billy the Kid was allegedly killed by Pat Garrett.

Written by Eric Powell, with artwork provided by Kyle Hotz, the series teams Billy the Kid with members of a travelling freak show in a quest to retrieve a powerful object from the castle of Dr. Victor Frankenstein.

== Characters ==
- Billy the Kid: Based on the historic figure, this fictional version is an uncouth, foul mouthed man. A childhood filled with abuse, that resulted in claustrophobia, is depicted in flashbacks throughout the series.
- Fineas Sproule: The owner and leader of Sproule's Biological Curiosities. Sproule has functional hands instead of feet and bills himself as the Human Spider.
- Aldwin Callahan: Born with reptilian skin and features, Callahan bills himself as the Alligator Man.
- Isadora Mavrites: The show's Tattooed lady, Isadora's tattoos are supernatural in nature, shifting to give hints of future events.
- Hector Delgado: Born with features that make him resemble a werewolf, Delgado bills himself as the Wolf Boy.
- Jeffrey Tinsle: Billed as the Miniature Boy, Jeffrey is a young man of extremely small size.
- Watta the Wild Man: No other name is known for this giant of a man. Watta appears to have a savage nature and is very protective of Jeffrey Tinsle.

== Plot synopsis ==
=== Issue #1 ===
After faking his own death, William H. Bonney, A.K.A. Billy the Kid, encounters a man named Fineas Sproule on a train. Sproule proposes that Bonney follow him back to his traveling carnival. In exchange for giving him shelter, Bonney will accompany Sproule and a small group of his performers to Europe where they intend to steal a powerful supernatural object with an evil history known as the Golem's Heart from the castle of Dr. Victor Frankenstein.

After a number of introductions and a dinner that results with most of the carnival members disliking Bonney, the carnival is attacked by Leonard Abradale, a former associate of Sproule who wants the Golem's Heart all for himself. The fight is short and Abradale retreats.

=== Issue #2 ===
Billy the Kid and his allies arrive in the small village surrounding the castle of Victor Frankenstein and rent out some rooms at the local inn. Sproule sends Callahan and Delgado to scout out the castle. After a point where they are an hour late for their time of return, the tattoos on Isadora's right shoulder shift into a skull like image. Moments after this a misshapen creature appears at the window and is shot by Billy the Kid.

=== Issue #3 ===
Billy the kid and his allies are attacked and captured by the creations of Victor Frankenstien. After waking up in a dungeon, they are greeted and invited to dinner by Victor Frankenstein himself. At dinner Frankenstein uncovers a platter in the center of the table, revealing the severed head of Hector Delgado and orders Billy the Kid and his allies chained to a nearby wall. Frankenstein chooses Jeffrey to be dissected and ties the young man to a nearby table. As he prepares for the operation, Frankenstein explains how he used the Golem's Heart to create his creatures.

A verbal confrontation between Billy the Kid and Frankenstein results in Billy the Kid being locked in a trunk and thrown outside the castle.

=== Issue #4 ===
An enraged Watta breaks free from his chains and frees Jeffrey who flees. In response, an emotionless Frankenstein runs a sword through Watta's torso from behind, killing him.

Now outside the castle, Jeffrey finds the trunk containing Billy the Kid, who is whimpering in fear caused by his claustrophobia. After being freed and taking some time to recover, Billy the Kid returns to the castle which is now under attack from a tank like machine operated by Leonard Abradale. Abradale is quickly killed by Frankenstein's creations.

Abradale's death proves to be a good distraction for Billy the Kid as he attacks Frankenstein's creations. In the chaos Jeffrey gains control of the Golem's Heart and orders Frankenstein's creations to attack and kill their creator.

When everything calms down, Sproule reveals the reasons why he and his companions wanted the Golem's Heart. The decision is then made to destroy it. When this is done all of Frankenstein's creations fall dead.

== Sequels ==
There were two follow up limited series:

- Billy the Kid's Old Timey Oddities and the Orm of Loch Ness (#1-4)
- Billy the Kid's Old Timey Oddities and the Ghastly Fiend of London (#1-4)

== Sources ==
- Dark Horse Comics profile Archived 2007-04-15 at the Wayback Machine
- Billy the Kid's Old Timey Oddities at the Grand Comics Database
- Billy the Kid's Old Timey Oddities at the Comic Book DB (archived from the original)
