= Remains (comics) =

Comic Book Series

Publication information
- Publisher: IDW Publishing
- Schedule: Monthly
- Format: Limited series
- Genre: Horror; Post-Apocalyptic; Science fiction
- Publication date: May – August 2004
- No. of issues: 5

Creative team
- Created by: Steve Niles; Kieron Dwyer
- Written by: Steve Niles
- Artist: Kieron Dwyer
- Letterer: Robbie Robbins
- Colorist: Harper Jaten
- Editor: Jeff Mariotte

Collected editions
- Remains: ISBN 1-932382-38-0

Remains is a five-issue comic book limited series published by IDW Publishing in 2004. The story is written by Steve Niles and has art by Kieron Dwyer.

Remains is about a post-apocalyptic world overrun with flesh-eating zombies.

== Characters ==
- Tom Bennett
- Tori
- Colonel Glenn Ramsey
- Cindy Ramsey
- Spaulding
- Flo

== Plot ==
On an invitation from president Shirley Wallace, every leading nations of the world came to an agreement of complete disarmament. But when a VIP guest's meddling son named Spaulding sneaks into the nuclear oven of Nevada and pressed a button he wasn't supposed to, humanity is literally doomed. The radiation turned the entire populace within the blast-radius into flesh-eating zombies.

During the meltdown, outside Nevada, in Reno, Silver Star Hotel and Casino's Blackjack dealer Tom Bennett was busy screwing waitress Tori inside the vault. They came out with the realization that they are the only remaining persons that haven't been turned into zombies. But as their life in a post-apocalyptic period goes on, they realize they have even bigger threats to worry about.

== Collected editions ==
Remains was published as a trade paperback by IDW Publishing, ISBN 1-932382-38-0.

== Film adaptation ==
The comic book has been optioned to be a made into a television film that would appear on the Chiller television network.

Filming on Steve Niles' Remains wrapped in June 2011 and the film premiered on Chiller on December 6, 2011.

== Awards ==
- 2005: Keiron Dwyer was nominated for the "Best Cover Artist" Eisner Award, for his Remains covers

== See also ==
- List of zombie novels
