= The Goon =

Comic book series

- Cover of The Goon: For Want of Whiskey and Blood (October 2014)

Publication information
- Publisher: Avatar Press; Albatross Exploding Funny Books; Dark Horse Comics
- Schedule: Monthly
- Format: Ongoing series
- Genre: Crime, Comedy horror
- Publication date: March 1999 – present
- No. of issues: 54

Creative team
- Created by: Eric Powell

The Goon is a supernatural crime comic book series written and drawn by Eric Powell. The series mixes both a comical tone with scenes of violence, which pit the titular character against conventional crime villains, such as mobsters and gang leaders, as well as creatures from horror and science fiction, including zombies, ghosts, ghouls, mutants, giant squids, extra-dimensional aliens, mad scientists, and robots.

== Publication history ==
An early prototype of The Goon was first published in 1995, in a book called Best Cellars #1 from Out of the Cellar Comics. This prototype was called Monster Boy, and the story was written and illustrated by Eric Powell.

The Goon first appeared in a cameo in a one-page preview in Avatar Illustrated (June 1998) by Avatar Press. Powell was unhappy with the quality of the book, so after three issues, he ceased producing new material and waited for his contract to expire. After this, he was unable to find another publisher, so he moved into self-publishing in 2002 with Albatross Exploding Funny Books. These self-published issues caught the eye of Dark Horse Comics, which approached Powell by telling him that did not know why they had passed on the book; in 2003, publication of The Goon moved to Dark Horse.

The character appeared in Satan's Sodomy Baby.

After Dark Horse Comics published issue #18, The Goon went on hiatus to allow Eric Powell to work on Chinatown, a graphic novel exploring the Goon's backstory. The graphic novel was released as Chinatown and the Mystery of Mr. Wicker in 2007. The series returned with issue #19 on July 11, 2007.

A one-shot comic was released titled Dethklok vs. The Goon on July 22, 2009. Both Powell and Brendon Small co-wrote the comic.

Another one-shot comic was released titled When Freaks Collide in July 2011. It was a collaboration between the Criminal Macabre comic series and The Goon by Steve Niles, Christopher Mitten, and Eric Powell.

In 2019, Eric Powell's Albatross Funnybooks began publishing a new ongoing Goon series. The series ran for fourteen issues from March 13, 2019 to February 22, 2022.

== Characters ==
=== Main characters ===
==== The Goon ====
An orphan raised by his Aunt Kizzie, a strong-woman for a carnival. When wanted gangster Labrazio made the carnival his hiding place, Goon snuck into his trailer after hearing about the man's reputation for viciousness. Labrazio showed the young Goon a book containing the names of his enemies, people who had done him favors, and people who owed him money. The police managed to track Labrazio down, however, and surrounded the trailer. In the resulting shoot-out, Goon's Aunt Kizzie, while trying to protect her nephew, was gunned down by stray bullets from Labrazio's firearm. When Labrazio dismissed Kizzie as a "stupid broad" for getting in the crossfire, the young Goon snapped and beat the mobster's skull in with a rock. Figuring the late gangster owed him something, Goon took Labrazio's book (and the man's hat) and took over the entire operation, collecting money and offing deadbeats, all the while insisting that Labrazio was still alive and the Goon was merely his "enforcer". The Goon is a hulking figure, normally wearing green pants, a white or black shirt, and the hat he removed from Labrazio. Occasionally he wears a faded blue shirt with green stripes on the sleeves—the uniform from his football days. The left side of his face is horribly scarred, caused in a fight with a Triad leader who could turn himself into a dragon by the use of dark magic (as explained in The Goon graphic novel Chinatown). His eyes are blue, with the scarring on the left side of his face rendering his left eye blind. He has brown hair cropped short, almost always covered by his trademark cap.

==== Franky ====
After killing Labrazio, the Goon met Franky, a cowardly kid who was continually picked on by bullies. They became fast friends after the Goon beat up a kid who tormented him. The Goon involved Franky in his criminal business, setting out to burn down a barbershop which refused to pay protection to "Labrazio". During the arson attempt, they were attacked by zombies. Franky, not believing he could, killed one in self-defense, at which time he underwent a change in personality, adopting a haughty "tough-guy" persona similar to the Goon's, and taking up the position of the Goon's right-hand man. Franky normally wears brown pants with suspenders, a white tank-top, and a brown fedora on his bald head. Franky's eyes are drawn without pupils, similar to the comic strip character Little Orphan Annie or Jiggs from Bringing Up Father. Franky is nowhere near the Goon's level in combat prowess, but he has proven himself useful many times, if nothing else than to watch the Goon's back and act as another set of hands. His signature move is the "knife to the eye".

==== The Zombie Priest/Nameless Man ====
Archnemesis of the Goon, the Priest is a mysterious man who dwells on Lonely Street, protected on all sides by his undead hordes. The Zombie Priest (also called The Nameless Man and other variations) is steeped in the occult, and seems bent on building up his rotting army, perhaps to one day conquer humankind. He is grizzled and almost zombie-like in appearance himself, sporting a top hat decorated by the flayed skin of a face. The Priest's chief creations are the greenish animated corpses that occupy much of Lonely Street, but he has also succeeded in reanimating an enormous chimp more than once. Evil appears drawn to him, as vicious hags and giant bats provide extra protection for his stronghold, and goat-like demons advise him in his undertakings. The Zombie Priest was recently revealed to be a demonic creature himself, and perhaps the inspiration for the folk tale "Rumpelstiltskin", as he spent a thousand years in hell after a princess discovered his name. The Priest's true name is his most closely guarded secret, as anyone who knows it has power over him.

Due to the recent reappearance of the Buzzard and the efforts of the Goon, the Zombie Priest's undead hordes have dwindled to nearly nothing. Faced with oblivion at the hands of his enemies, the Nameless Man has taken drastic measures to rebuild his army. Resurrecting one last zombie known simply as "Mother Corpse", the Zombie Priest plucked out one of his own eyes to imbue her with a special power: procreation. With a termite-like abdomen that fills an entire room, Mother Corpse spawns countless miniature demons who are grown and lethal within six hours of birth. With a new legion of monsters at his command, the Zombie Priest is far from being defeated; the full cost of this new power, however, has yet to be seen.

The Priest has fallen from grace, with the arrival of another of his kind, dressed as an Indian warrior. This creature cut out the Priest's remaining eye to somehow create or bring back Labrazio. The Priest spends his days now writhing in pain, being tortured, and enduring endless humiliations from his successor. After Labrazio was defeated by the Goon, the Priest was then freed by Buzzard after being held captive, to be used as a weapon against Labrazio. He has recently taken the eye of The Cat and begun to make preparations for the Indian Warrior's return, saying: "He'll bring the others when he comes back ... But this town is mine!"

==== The Coven ====
A clan of supernatural entities from the same inhuman race as the Priest. Called sorcerers, priests, demons, and witches, they are referred to as 'magpies' by the Goon and his crew. The Coven plots to exploit the power of the curse lying over the town to restore their race to its former greatness. Their arrival in town sparked an all-out war with the Goon. The Coven each have bizarre animal familiars with misshapen human heads, like the Priest's cat familiar, who vanish when they are slain. They regard the Priest as the least of them, and look upon him with disdain after having cast him out long ago. The Priest has allied himself with the Goon to destroy the Coven, revealing their powers and weaknesses to his former enemy.

- The Arab – The leader of the Coven. He plans to break Goon's spirit and then kill him, adding to the power of the curse over the town which he intends to command.
- Longfingers – Described as the 'general' of the Coven. A sadistic, ghoulish monster with an inhuman appearance, Longfingers feeds on stolen children and the suffering of their parents. He may have inspired the 'Boogeyman' legend as the Priest inspired the legend of Rumpelstiltskin. Longfingers has a tall, thin body and his hands can sprout vicious nails. He is able to fight physically on par with the Goon, with neither opponent being able to defeat the other. Of all the Coven, Goon wants to kill Longfingers the most.
- Spade – A being claiming to have the power to see through the eyes of men. He was killed by Willie Nagel with a shotgun blast to the head – as an eyeless zombie, Nagel was immune to Spade's power.
- Spindle – An old woman with the power to turn herself and the other Coven members to fog. Goon countered her power by throwing acid bottles into her fog form, causing her to be burned by the fumes and forcing her back into her physical form. Goon then killed her by pouring acid on her.
- Stone – A member of the Coven with unknown abilities. He was killed by the Goon with an axe.
- Rake – A member of the Coven with unknown abilities. He was killed by Longfingers after a falling out among the Coven over the Arab's machinations.

==== Claire Buckley (Buzzard) ====
Former sheriff of a Western town where the Zombie Priest came as a "missionary". As Buzzard was the only doubter of the Priest's unholy wisdom, he was shunned by his people and spiraled into an alcohol-fueled despair. Meanwhile, the town was stricken by a virulent plague that killed the townfolk, then brought them back from the grave. After being mocked by the Zombie Priest for failing to protect his citizens, the sheriff became consumed by vengeance and rode through the town, slaughtering zombies and storming the Nameless Man's camp. The terrified Priest attempted to use his necromancy on the sheriff, but rather than turning him into a zombie, it had a reverse effect. He became a living man with an insatiable hunger for the flesh of the dead, which garnered him the name "Buzzard". In the years that followed, he tracked the Priest across the countryside in a single-minded quest to avenge the town he didn't protect. As the trail led Buzzard into the city, he met the Goon and Franky in the midst of a zombie ambush. After telling the men his story, he informed them both he was going to storm the Nameless Man's tower. Despite the protests of the Goon, he continued his hunt into the very stronghold of his enemy. Upon reaching Lonely Street, Buzzard found himself surrounded. As the zombies closed in, he continued firing until both his handguns were empty, and the panel fades to black.

Seemingly dead, he was forgotten for months. He was, however, imprisoned in the tower of his enemy, tortured for months and starved to a near-skeletal state. Buzzard then managed to send a message to the Goon through a small spirit he befriended in his cell. The Goon gathered a rescue party and stormed Lonely Street and, with the help of Hieronymous Alloy and his robot Bruno, Buzzard was freed from torment. The last words yelled from the Zombie Priest were a reminder to Buzzard how he had failed in his mission to protect the town where he was once the Sheriff. The knowledge of his defeat drove him to despair and he attempted to commit suicide by shooting himself in the head. However, the Zombie Priest's curse kept him alive. After regaining strength, Buzzard buried himself alive beneath a tree on the outskirts of town. His mind wandered as he lay entombed, and the spirits in the woods told him many secrets, including the origin of the Zombie Priest, and the Goon's destiny as the only one who could triumph against the Nameless Man. His purpose renewed, Buzzard clawed his way free of the roots and soil to aid the Goon in his fight. Buzzard now guards the city's graveyards, preventing the creation of new zombies.

During the attack by Labrazio, Buzzard enslaved the Priest as a weapon against the resurrected mobster. After the battle was over, Buzzard commanded the Priest to reverse his curse, only to be told that the spell has evolved, making Buzzard an unknown type of creature that even the Priest does not understand, and that there may be no cure.

==== Labrazio ====
Seemingly returned from death by the dark magic of the Priest's people, Labrazio has seized control of the Lonely Street gang and begun a vicious offensive on the Goon, already having killed Norton's mother and one of the two Mudd Brothers. His nature is debatable, given that he has extreme supernatural powers of shapeshifting and he is colored blue. Also, Goon found his body naturally rotting in the grave he had been buried in, leaving little doubt that, whatever the new Labrazio, he is not the one the Goon killed.

During a climactic battle on Lonely Street, it was revealed that the spirit of the original Labrazio was channeled into changeling creatures created by the Mother Corpse, a spell done by the Priest. It was revealed that the mysterious turbaned old man who commanded the Priest to resurrect Labrazio was a friend of his. Before being finally killed by the Goon, Labrazio revealed that the people of the turbaned man will be coming to the town, mockingly warning the Goon that he would rather be dead than face them.

=== Recurring characters ===
==== Hieronymous Alloy ====
A brilliant scientist whose attempts to help the public have nearly all back-fired, one of them landing him in debt to the Goon after wrongfully sending Bruno one of his murderous robots after him. Alloy then turned his attentions to more virtuous pursuits, such as destroying zombies on Lonely Street and defeating a giant Spanish-speaking lizard poised to destroy the city. Dr Alloy has golden, metallic skin—an apparent side-effect of his extensive alchemical research. Recent campaigns (caused by the molecular break-down of his body, and ensuing insanity) to annihilate everyone with his robot army for not believing that his gene-modified creamed corn was superior, have landed him back in prison, where he has decided to stay for his own edification as well as the safety of humanity. He has recently sent the Goon some two-way radios in the fight against Labrazio, as Alloy felt that he could never fully repay his debt to the Goon.

==== Norton ====
Norton is the bald and mild-mannered bartender of Norton's place, the Goon's favorite hangout. While of little importance to the story overall, Norton can be depended on for pretty much anything the Goon needs. After his mother's death, Norton has evolved into a major character, taking up his mother's gypsy ways and marrying the leader of her rival clan.

==== The Little, Unholy Bastards ====
A group of juvenile delinquents who first made their appearance with the intention of breaking the Goon out of prison. They live at the McGreg Home For Illegitimate, Wayward and Possibly Homicidal Youth. Though they aided Goon in his prison break and later discovered Merle's betrayal and passed it on to the Goon, they have proven to be little more than a nuisance, the Goon having no need for kids in his operation. He allowed them to spy for him saying if they die it would be better than living in the cursed town. He seems to have warmed up to them, as of late, going out of his way to save the kids when they were attacked by a hobo deity. They are Smitty (the leader), Specs, Charlotte, and Peewee.

During Labrazio's attack on the town, Specs was shot by the inhuman mobster. Specs reappeared in the next issue sporting his arm in a sling.

Most recently, in The Goon No. 34, The Little Unholy Bastards were saved by The Goon when he, in a drunken stupor, fought a demon in the form of a girl, forcing her into a nearby cemetery where she perished.

==== Mirna ====
A singer at Norton's Place. She has shown interest in the Goon, though he feels that he is too hideous for any woman to be genuinely interested in him. She has never shown any signs of duplicitous behavior. Her brother's death disturbed her greatly, and she came to despise Goon. His resurrection as a zombie left her mentally unhinged. Mirna came back to the town to investigate the return of Skinny, only after his second death, became even more confused, but was convinced by the Goon to help Bella, injured by an attack by Labrazio. Upon learning that Bella had a son with the Goon, Mirna went into a state of rage and left town again.

==== Cat ====
A small orange cat with a jowelled and weathered human face. The Cat is perhaps the Zombie Priest's most loyal minion, and is given to long-winded speeches on the subject of his master's greatness. Lazlo and the Graves have great contempt for the creature, but the Cat has proved himself useful enough to keep around, even giving one of his eyes to his blind master, although this was an unexpected action by the Priest. It is suggested in the recent story arc that the cat is the Priest's familiar spirit.

==== Willie Nagel ====
Besides Lazlo, he is the only other zombie in the Goon's world to speak coherently. However, Willie has chosen to distance himself from the Zombie Priest. Willie has more than a passing similarity to Spider since they both wear bowler hats, are scam artists, and hang around the Goon despite being constantly abused by him. Unlike Spider, he has actually proven himself useful to the Goon, even if it was for a price. Willie believes the reason he retained his personality as a zombie is due to him living life to the fullest when he was still alive.

==== Skinny/Mr. Wicker ====
Skinny was Mirna's younger brother, a piano player and stockboy at Norton's Place. His determination to be somebody, coupled with his unprovoked hatred of the Goon, led him to become the mysterious Mr. Wicker. Using a book of magic stolen from Momma Norton, Skinny transformed himself into a hulking figure of twisted branches, able to engulf himself in deadly flames. As the Goon battled for his life against Mr. Wicker, Franky destroyed the book, and the Goon accidentally killed the boy as he became Skinny once more. He was resurrected as a zombie, with his Wicker powers intact, to work for Labrazio, only to be killed by the Goon again.

==== El Hombre de Lagarto ====
Formerly a Godzilla-like monster, after being defeated by the Goon he has been reduced to acting as a manservant to Dr. Alloy. Though his behavior has been curbed by drugs, the second incarceration of Alloy led to a lapse in his medication and a resultant rampage through the more quaint parts of Goon's turf. Lagarto speaks Spanish, but with little regard to grammar or coherence.

==== Spider ====
A giant talking spider who wears a bowler hat. Spider has the rare distinction of being a criminal that the Goon dislikes but hasn't killed. He can be seen skipping out on child support, cheating at cards or hustling others at Norton's Bar. He's also the victim of violence from the Goon and others, having been beaten mercilessly simply for being a talking spider or for owing the Goon five bucks. He is shown to have an acidic bite, but when rallying any men he could, the Goon dismissed Spider as "useless". In Drawing On Your Nightmares, Spider's real name was revealed as Percival Goodbody. The same story also revealed that his children are ashamed of him and apologize for his actions repeatedly.

==== Momma Norton ====
The seemingly crazy gypsy mother of pub owner Norton. Though her advice has often aided Goon, it usually comes in the form of eccentric behavior. She was recently shot to death by the returned Labrazio, who feared her gypsy magic as a threat.

==== Lazlo ====
Lazlo is the green-skinned zombie assistant of the Zombie Priest. He differs from most other zombies in that he can form complete sentences. He has been seen in flashbacks as having once looked far more human. When Labrazio takes over, Lazlo seems to have no compunctions with the change in leadership, and happily participates in the beating of his former master. During the final battle on Lonely Street between Goon and Labrazio, Lazlo's head was blown to pieces by Franky.

==== The Mudd Brothers ====
Bill and Charlie Mudd are a pair of Bog Lurk brothers that work as enforcers for the Goon (and Franky for a short time while Goon was in prison). They have a penchant for breaking legs for not meeting debt payments (often regardless of when the payment is made). They are rightfully regarded as moronic but brutal, so they have their uses in the world of the Goon. Bill Mudd was murdered by Labrazio's gang after Merle ratted them out. Charlie, in a state of grief, travels around with a tree stump he believes to be Bill. He has gone into vicious fits of rage since Bill's death, even savagely murdering Joey the Ball, who had put a hit out on the Mudds.

==== Fishy Pete ====
Leader of a vicious gang of fish-men that patrol the city's harbor. Fishy Pete has a special hatred for the Goon, the man responsible for his dual peg legs and hook hands. Pete's mother is the legendary Sea Hag who "seduces" stranded mariners, much to her son's embarrassment. Fishy Pete speaks in typical pirate brogue, and is fond of quoting Quint's lines from Jaws.

==== Jimmy Turtle ====
Another rarely seen friend of the Goon's, although he did appear in person in time for Franky to smash a beer bottle into his face. A professional scam artist with a penchant for smashing rocks over people's heads, Jimmy Turtle once helped Franky in a quest to find the Legendary Boxcar of Well-Made Ladies Shoes.

==== Merle ====
Merle was a werewolf and part-time gunrunner for the Goon. In human form he usually dresses in a vest and beat-up cowboy hat, and has brown fur in werewolf form. The Goon calls him in from time to time to help out in a fix. Merle is also a chronic alcoholic, and has a severe phobia of midget hands. Merle eventually ratted out the Mudd Brothers to Labrazio and paid for it with his life. Upon discovering his betrayal the Goon tortured him sadistically, taking advantage of his werewolf ability to endure punishment that would kill a human, finally ending his life with a silver bullet. His bastard son, a werewolf like his father, came to kill the Goon in revenge, but failed and ended up adopted as a pet by the Little Unholy Bastards.

==== The Psychic Seal ====
A seal wearing a turban that can speak the future and reads omens, the Seal has made two appearances to date. He speaks in the usual "Ark! Ark!" of seals, but anyone listening can understand him perfectly. He has an unfortunate habit of "Ark"-ing insults about his clients' mothers, which led to his receiving a savage beating at the hands of Franky and the Goon.

==== The Graves ====
A family of three sickly men, a widowed father and twin sons. Each of the three men is afflicted with leprosy, the price the eldest Grave paid for making a pact with the Zombie Priest. They often get beaten or blown up by the Goon on their body-snatching raids for the Zombie Priest. Despite being unable to communicate normally, the twins are capable of speaking Hobo, thus saving them from the wrath of the Hobo Jungle's many cannibals. During the creation of Mother Corpse, the Graves, finally having found the Nameless man's acts too depraved to handle, abandoned their service to him and left the town.

==== Mother Corpse ====
Due to Buzzard's and the Goon's efforts, the Zombie Priest's corpse fueled army has almost completely been destroyed. As a result, he was forced to turn to magic—namely Mother Corpse—who is capable of birthing hordes of miniature demons ("Chugheads") that can combine themselves into a larger monster. Mother Corpse was made from the body of a dead pregnant woman and hallucinates the Chugheads as normal human children. The miniature demons were revealed to be containing the spirit of Labrazio, leading to Mother's spell being shut down by the Priest, under Buzzard's control.

==== Charlie Noodles ====
The oft-mentioned but never seen friend of the Goon and Franky. Almost all of their anecdotes involve Charlie Noodles at some point, and the Goon always refers to the man as "good people".

==== Joey the Ball ====
An early gang rival of the Goon, Joey the Ball has the odd distinction of his right hand being permanently stuck inside a bowling ball. Due to this unbalanced weight training, the otherwise midget-sized Joey has one gargantuan, hyper-muscular arm. He strives to commit all his crimes with a sense of panache, and always speaks in the third-person narrative. Joey the Ball arranged to murder Bill Mudd for Labrazio, and was subsequently killed in retaliation by Charlie Mudd.

==== Peaches Valentine ====
This odd character has appeared in several issues (including the Christmas special where he played Tiny Tim). Recognizable by his 'Chick Magnet' shirt, Peaches is intellectually disabled and prone to making messes with his own feces. He has been shot in the face several times by Franky, but always reappears no worse for wear.

=== Miscellaneous characters ===
==== Dwight T. Albatross ====
Dwight T. Albatross is the irate, often intoxicated friend of Eric Powell who has made many appearances in the comic's letter columns. Albatross is never afraid to speak his mind and often keeps the Machiavellian madness of Eric Powell in check. Dwight had been arrested for destroying issues of The Goon in retribution for his unjust termination at the hands of Powell. Unlike the rest of Powell's characters, Dwight is 'played' by a real person. Photographs of Albatross appeared in The Goon: Noir, a miniseries done by various creators while Powell worked on Chinatown and other projects. The real Albatross maintains a MySpace page, moderates the message board of The Goon at the Dark Horse Comics website, and appears at San Diego Comic-Con.

==== The Atomic Rage ====
He is Characterized by a distinct cranial aperture and a volatile physiological composition. Known for utilizing aggressive verbal expressions and possessing an inherently radioactive neurological structure, the entity is recognized within its fictional universe for its disruptive behavior and hazardous physical traits.

==== Margaret Snodgrass ====
A Southern Bible-thumper who aided in the delay of the issue #18's original story, "Satan's Sodomy Baby". At the 2006 Comic Con, Powell's booth carried fan-made buttons declaring "Screw Snodgrass! Demand Satan's Sodomy Baby!" which were given out as a gift to fans of The Goon.

=== Threat creatures ===
- Zombies: Zombies are the primary servants of the Zombie Priest. Very few seem to be capable of speaking or performing other complex tasks. Raised by necromancy, they are capable of following orders, though only from the Zombie Priest himself. Referred to by Franky and the Goon as "slackjaws".
- Hobos: Hobos are the cannibal overlords of the dark forested region known as the "Hobo Jungul". The culture of the Hobo is apparently completely separate from the rest of the world, so far as they have their own language and resemble cavemen more than humans.
- Brunos: An army of deadly robots/robotic servants are designed by Dr. Hieronymous Alloy, all inexplicably sharing the name "Bruno". These drones have a distinctly retro sci-fi aesthetic, and are equipped with weaponry ranging from lasers to boxing gloves one of them are very Large or small to fight goon in Hand-to-hand combat skills, pillaging the town and forcing the townspeople (especially the zombie priest's minions) in Lonely Street.
- Bog Lurks: A race of ogre-like creatures that inhabit the swamps outside of town. Despite their low intelligence, the Bog Lurks' great strength has opened up many career opportunities for them in the city's criminal underworld.
- Hags: Another of the Zombie Priest's monstrous servants, hags' grandmotherly appearance belies their bloodthirsty nature. These creatures do have their tender side, however, as they act as midwives for Mother Corpse's demon spawn.
- The Decasters: The ghosts of a perverse inbred family who haunted an old mansion on the outskirts of the city. While the Decasters had driven most intruders to madness and death, the Goon managed to exorcise them with cats' eyes strung on cinnamon dental floss.
- Skunk Ape: The Skunk Ape is a large, sasquatch-like monster with a hideous odor. The Skunk Ape is driven to homicidal enthusiasm by the scent of pies (especially blueberry).
- Communist Airborne Mollusk Militia: A squadron of immense octopuses who achieve flight via personal zeppelins. While apparently intelligent enough to speak French and operate aircraft, they made the mistake of allying with the Zombie Priest. The Militia was last seen being blown sky high by the Goon and Hellboy.
- Giant Squid: Another cephalopod nuisance for the Goon, the Giant Squid have a tendency to crawl onto land and attack cars along Crestwood Avenue.
- Vampires: A coven of preening, pretentious bloodsuckers who continually find themselves beaten senseless by the Goon. The vampires lurk in one of the city's graveyards, discussing fashion and pursuing other vanities. It is later revealed that they are a diluted form of vampires, fairly disgraceful in their current state.
- Rats: Man-eating rodents the size of St. Bernards, these monsters prowl a lonely stretch known as Rat Alley.
- Chug-Heads: The Chug-Heads have replaced zombies as the bulk of the Zombie Priest's army. Products of Mother Corpse, they are small, dwarf-like creatures with large, potato-shaped heads. Unlike zombies, they are capable of merging into one another to create a larger, more deadly monster.
- Giant Zombie Chimp: This creature was once a normal chimpanzee; however, he was captured by Lazlo and was brought to the Zombie Priest who turned him into a 15-foot, undead creature. Since then he became a weapon to be used by the Zombie Priest against The Goon and Franky

== Spin-offs ==
A three-part miniseries featuring the character Buzzard, set after the events of Goon Year (simply entitled "Buzzard") was later published in The Goon: Volume 10.

The Goon: Noir is a series of original short stories by various artists and authors (not including Eric Powell himself), which take place within the world of The Goon. Notable authors include well-known comics such as Tom Lennon, Brian Posehn, and Patton Oswalt.

Not necessarily a spin-off, but maintaining a similar tone while being appropriate for all ages, is another recently published comic by Powell called Chimichanga. Chimichanga is about a bearded girl, a gorilla monster and a witch. Originally a self-published graphic novel, in September 2011 the novel was published in hardcover format by Dark Horse Comics, with colours by Dave Stewart.

=== Film ===
The Goon official site said in 2008 that a CG animated film of The Goon was to be produced by Blur Studio and David Fincher and written by Eric Powell. Clancy Brown was to voice The Goon and Paul Giamatti as Franky. A release date was not specified, nor had a plot. The film's future was uncertain as it had trouble procuring funds. The film's poster stated that it would be released theatrically. The first trailer from the film was released on 20 July 2010. Powell updated the film status in January 2012, in his words: "The Goon is in the exact same position it's been in for the past couple of years. Prepping the design and script while searching for funding".

Blur Studio and Fincher launched a 30-day Kickstarter in October 2012, an on-line fundraising campaign, titled "The Goon" Movie... let's KICKSTART this sucker!!!", to raise $400,000 to finance a story reel for the entire film. The Kickstarter page also explained why they need the money: "The Goon film has NEVER been in production. All the work you've seen (animation footage, trailers, artwork, etc.) has been produced independently and out-of-pocket by the creative team of David Fincher, Eric Powell, Blur Studio and Dark Horse Entertainment. We created "proof of concept" footage to show Hollywood the incredible potential of a Goon movie. It was very well received BUT because this movie isn't a sequel or filled with dancing animals we'll need more to bust open the gates and UNLEASH Goon and Franky on Hollywood". Two days before the deadline, the landmark was achieved, and the campaign closed on November 11, raising $441,900 from 7,576 backers. Blur Studios and Tim Miller teased an upcoming announcement in 2017 regarding the film and said it "would happen".

The film was announced to be in development with 20th Century Fox and Chernin Entertainment in 2019. However, as a result of the Disney/Fox merger, the film was dropped, entering a search for a new distributor. In July 2022, Tim Miller announced that Netflix acquired the distribution rights to the film with Patrick Osborne set to write and direct, and Jeff Fowler and David Fincher set to serve as producers.

== Collected editions ==
=== Trade paperbacks ===
The series is collected in trade paperbacks:

Volume	Title	Collects	Published	ISBN
0	Rough Stuff	The Goon #1–3 (Avatar Press)	April 14, 2004 (1st) January 6, 2010 (2nd)	ISBN 9781593070861 (1st) ISBN 9781595824684 (2nd)
1	Nothin' But Misery	The Goon Color Special (self-published); The Goon #1–4 (self-published); Die, Fish, Die! (from 'Dark Horse Presents')	July 16, 2003 (1st) May 18, 2011 (2nd)	ISBN 9781569719985 (1st) ISBN 9781595826244 (2nd)
2	My Murderous Childhood (and Other Grievous Yarns)	The Goon #1–4; The Goon Meets the Brothers Mud	May 5, 2004 (1st) October 13, 2010 (2nd)	ISBN 9781593071097 (1st) ISBN 9781595826169 (2nd)
3	Heaps of Ruination	The Goon #5–8	February 23, 2005 (1st) August 31, 2011 (2nd)	ISBN 9781593072926 (1st) ISBN 9781595826251 (2nd)
4	Virtue and the Grim Consequences Thereof	The Goon #9–13	February 8, 2006 (1st) October 27, 2010 (2nd)	ISBN 9781593074562 (1st) ISBN 9781595826176 (2nd)
5	Wicked Inclinations	The Goon #14–18	December 13, 2006 (1st) November 30, 2011 (2nd)	ISBN 9781593076467 (1st) ISBN 9781595826268 (2nd)
6	Chinatown and the Mystery of Mr. Wicker	Chinatown and the Mystery of Mr. Wicker (hardcover original graphic novel)	December 16, 2009	ISBN 9781595824066
7	A Place of Heartache and Grief	The Goon #19–23	May 20, 2009	ISBN 9781595823113
8	Those That is Damned	The Goon #24–27	June 24, 2009	ISBN 9781595823243
9	Calamity of Conscience	The Goon #28–31	September 16, 2009	ISBN 9781595823465
10	Death's Greedy Comeuppance	The Goon #32–33; The Buzzard #1–3	January 19, 2011	ISBN 9781595826435
11	The Deformed of Body and Devious of Mind	An Irish Wake; The Goon's on Vacation; The Goon #34–37	June 27, 2012	ISBN 9781595828811
12	Them That Raised Us Lament	The Goon #38–41	February 20, 2013	ISBN 9781616550066
13	For Want of Whiskey and Blood	The Goon #41–45	October 8, 2014	ISBN 9781616551018
14	Occasion of Revenge	The Goon #46–49	April 1, 2015	ISBN 9781616555962
15	Once Upon a Hard Time	The Goon #50–53	April 27, 2016	ISBN 9781506700984
Series 2, Vol 1	A Ragged Return To Lonely Street	The Goon (2019) #1–4; The Maltese Bunny	September 25, 2019	ISBN 9781949889925
Series 2, Vol 2	The Deceit of a Cro-Magnon Dandy	The Goon (2019–2020) #5–8	November 24, 2020	ISBN 9781949889949
Series 2, Vol 3	Fishy Men, Witchy Women & Bitter Beer	The Goon (2020) #9–12	March 30, 2021	ISBN 9781949889024
19	Them That Don't Stay Dead	The Goon (2021–2022) #13–14; Albatross Exploding Funnybooks (2022) #1; The Goon: Them That Don't Stay Dead (2024–2025) #1–4;	November 11, 2025	ISBN 9781506744100

=== Fancy Pants Editions ===
The series has also been collected as hardcover 'Fancy Pants Editions':

Volume	Title	Collects	Published	ISBN
1		The Goon #1–2 (self-published); The Goon #1; The Goon #3; The Goon #5; The Goon #9; 3-page Buzzard story	October 12, 2005	ISBN 9781593074265
2	The Rise and Fall of the Diabolical Dr. Alloy	The Goon #2; The Goon #6; The Goon #11–13	February 27, 2008	ISBN 9781593079185
3	The Return of Labrazio	The Goon #20–31 (main stories only)	June 16, 2010	ISBN 9781595825032

=== Library Editions ===
Beginning in 2015, the series was collected in oversized hardcover Library Editions:

Title	Collects	Published	ISBN
Volume 1	The Goon ― Volume 0: Rough Stuff; The Goon ― Volume 1: Nothin' But Misery; The Goon ― Volume 2: My Murderous Childhood (and Other Grievous Yarns); The Goon ― Volume 3: Heaps of Ruination	November 11, 2015	ISBN 9781616558420
Volume 2	The Goon ― Volume 4: Virtue and the Grim Consequences Thereof; The Goon ― Volume 5: Wicked Inclinations; The Goon ― Volume 6: Chinatown and the Mystery of Mr. Wicker	February 3, 2016	ISBN 9781616558437
Volume 3	The Goon ― Volume 7: A Place of Heartache and Grief; The Goon — Volume 8: Those That is Damned; The Goon — Volume 9: Calamity of Conscience	June 1, 2016	ISBN 9781616559861
Volume 4	The Goon ― Volume 10: Death's Greedy Comeuppance; The Goon — Volume 11: The Deformed of Body and Devious of Mind; The Goon — Volume 12: Them That Raised Us Lament	October 5, 2016	ISBN 9781506700182
Volume 5	The Goon ― Volume 13: For Want of Whiskey and Blood; The Goon — Volume 14: Occasion of Revenge; The Goon — Volume 15: Once Upon a Hard Time; The Goon Noir	June 20, 2017	ISBN 9781506704012

=== Omnibus Editions ===
Beginning 2019, the series was collected as paperback Omnibus Editions:

Title	Collects	Published	ISBN
Volume 1	The Goon ― Volume 0: Rough Stuff; The Goon ― Volume 1: Nothin' But Misery; The Goon ― Volume 2: My Murderous Childhood (and Other Grievous Yarns); The Goon ― Volume 3: Heaps of Ruination	May 2019	ISBN 9780998379296
Volume 2	The Goon ― Volume 4: Virtue and the Grim Consequences Thereof; The Goon ― Volume 5: Wicked Inclinations; The Goon ― Volume 6: Chinatown and the Mystery of Mr. Wicker	December 2019	ISBN 9781949889932
Volume 3	The Goon ― Volume 7: A Place of Heartache and Grief; The Goon ― Volume 8: Those That Is Damned; The Goon ― Volume 9: Calamity of Conscience	December 2020	ISBN 9781949889956
Volume 4	The Goon ― Volume 10: Death's Greedy Comeuppance; The Goon — Volume 11: The Deformed of Body and Devious of Mind; The Goon — Volume 12: Them That Raised Us Lament	March 2021	ISBN 9781949889970
Volume 5	The Goon ― Volume 13: For Want of Whiskey and Blood; The Goon — Volume 14: Occasion of Revenge; The Goon — Volume 15: Once Upon a Hard Time; The Goon Noir	June 2021	ISBN 1949889033
Volume 6	The Goon ― Series 2, Volume 1: A Ragged Return to Lonely Street; The Goon ― Series 2, Volume 2: The Deceit of a Cro-Magnon Dandy; The Goon ― Series 2, Volume 3: Fishy Men, Witchy Women & Bitter Beer	August 2026	ISBN 1506754198

=== Other books ===
There are also two Books that were originally collected or published outside of the main series. They subsequently have been included in the later collected editions, and were originally collected or published as:

Title	Collects	Published	Format	ISBN
Dwight T. Albatross's The Goon: Noir	Dwight T. Albatross's The Goon: Noir #1–3	July 18, 2007	Trade paperback	ISBN 9781593077853
Chinatown and the Mystery of Mr. Wicker	This volume is an original graphic novel	November 21, 2007	Hardcover	ISBN 9781593078331

== Awards ==
- 2004 Eisner Award Winner (tie) – Best Single Issue/Single Story
- 2005 Eisner Award Winner – Best Continuing Series
- 2005 Eisner Award Winner – Best Humor Publication
- 2008 Eisner Award Winner – Best Writer/Artist—Humor
- 2008 Eisner Award Winner – Best Painter or Multimedia Artist (interior art)

== In other media ==
- In Degrassi: The Next Generation, the characters Adam and Eli read The Goon and discuss the Chinatown saga.
