= Remains (film) =

- Theatrical release poster
- Directed by: Colin Theys
- Screenplay by: John Doolan
- Based on: Remains by Steve Niles
- Produced by: Steve Niles; Ted Adams; Bonnie Farley-Lucas
- Starring: Miko Hughes; Lance Reddick; Grant Bowler; Tawny Cypress
- Cinematography: Adrian Correia
- Edited by: Daniel Herzog
- Music by: Matthew Llewellyn; Sarah Schachner
- Release date: December 6, 2011 (United States)
- Running time: 88 minutes
- Country: United States
- Language: English

Remains, also billed as Steve Niles' Remains, is a 2011 post-apocalyptic horror film. It depicts a small group of people in a Reno, Nevada casino who have survived a nuclear disaster while the rest of humanity has been turned into flesh eating zombies. It was produced by the Chiller Network and is based on the comic book series of the same name.

== Plot ==
Tom (Grant Bowler) and Tori (Evalena Marie) are employees at the fictional Silver Star Casino in Reno. On a slow day at the tables, Tom convinces Tori to join him in a stock room for a sexual encounter. At the same time a news report is airing about "Peace Day", a day when the entire world's supply of nuclear weapons is set to be destroyed. Something goes wrong during the event and a nuclear blast occurs, knocking out power to the casino and trapping Tom and Tori behind an electronic lock. When the power is restored they find the casino trashed and people gone, except for an old lady in a power chair who attacks Tori. After dispatching the old lady with a chair leg, they encounter magician's assistant Jensen (Miko Hughes). He tells them that he turned the power back on and that he isn't sure what happened. Tom and Jensen go up front to check the casino security cameras while Tori goes to the front door to look outside. Tom and Jensen see Victor (Anthony Marks) outside throwing a man to the zombies to save himself. Victor bolts into the casino and demands to be let in. Jensen lets him in and takes him to a bathroom to clean up while Tom and Tori decide to start trapping the other zombies in the casino.

The survivors trap zombies in various parts of the hotel and dispose of the dead off the hotel dock. They note that at night the zombies appear to be sleeping. They spend the next few days drinking, smoking, and playing cards to kill time. While on the roof, Tom spots a convoy of trucks but drops his radio off the roof before he can contact them. Deciding to use a spotlight from across the street to attract the convoy, they head out at night past the sleeping zombies. When the light is turned on music plays with it, waking the zombies. The group is separated, with Victor running back into the casino and Tom and Tori trapped on a bus. The army convoy arrives, rescuing Tom and Tori and taking shelter with them in the casino. The army's medic, Cindy (Tawny Cypress), patches up Tom's hand and tells them that the group is headed to Lake Tahoe. Jensen begins sneaking around and discovers that the army has taken all of the food and supplies from the casino with the help of Victor. He confronts the soldiers on the dock and a shootout occurs, killing Jensen. The army decides to leave immediately, but Tom stalls them by asking if they cleared out the pantry beyond the banquet hall. The soldiers force Tom to show them where it is, and he opens the door to release dozens of zombies that he and Tori trapped in the room earlier. The zombies overwhelm the soldiers, who flee the casino in a panic.

Tom and Tori make an attempt to escape in a car from the parking garage but cannot get the door open. After returning to the roof they spot Cindy returning in a pickup truck, which she rolls over in a crash when a zombie surprises her. Tom rescues Cindy and brings her back inside, where Tori threatens to shoot her. Cindy tells them that the convoy was attacked by a herd of faster, stronger zombies and that no one survived. Tori and Cindy argue and Tori taunts Cindy about her father's death. She then tells Cindy that Tom killed someone in a drunk driving crash in Vegas. Later on, while eating, Tom reveals to Cindy that he killed his wife and unborn child in the crash. They decide to travel to Carson City to try to find Cindy's daughter. In the morning, Tom and Cindy head to the roof to see that the herd of stronger zombies has arrived. At the front entrance, the stronger zombies are breaking down the barricade. Tom, Tori, and Cindy decide to try to use the explosives to escape. They open all the gas lines on the kitchen stoves and set a charge. As they are escaping Cindy is attacked and breaks her ankle. Tori tries to convince Tom to leave Cindy behind and when he refuses she hits him in the head with an axe, takes his gun, and leaves. Tori sets an explosive charge on the garage door and is attacked by a zombie. The zombie bites her but is killed in the blast. A dazed Tori wanders into the street and is swarmed by zombies. Tom and Cindy make it to the exit as the second explosive charge goes off, destroying most of the hotel and casino. They make it to the parking garage where they find the door blasted open. They find the Smart Car that Tori and Tom tried to escape in earlier and use it to leave the casino. In the final scene, a zombified Tori carries her shotgun and kills the weaker zombies—implying that she is stronger, faster, and still retains her human intelligence—and looks toward the direction where Tom and Cindy drove.

== Cast ==
- Grant Bowler as Tom, a casino dealer with a checkered past
- Evalena Marie as Tori, a cocktail waitress at the casino
- Miko Hughes as Jensen, a magician's assistant who moved to Reno to live with his boyfriend
- Anthony Marks as Victor, a ruthless survivor
- Lance Reddick as Ramsey, leader of the army convoy
- Tawny Cypress as Cindy, medic and Ramsey's daughter

== See also ==
- List of zombie films

== Works cited ==
- Hinckley, David (December 15, 2011). "Chiller's zombie flick 'Remains' almost makes us root for the undead". Daily News. Archived from the original on June 26, 2015.
