= The Agency (comics) =

2001 comic book miniseries

Cover of the first issue

The Agency was a comic book published by Top Cow and Image Comics from 2001 to 2002. Written by Paul Jenkins with art by Kyle Hotz, the book followed a team of cyborg mercenary police in a dystopian future United States. The entire six issue run of the title was collected and released as a trade paperback in 2007.

If you thought Blade Runner and Seven were dark and disturbing, you haven't seen anything yet!! From Paul Jenkins comes the newest must have Top Cow series, The Agency!! A futuristic tale of special operatives, designed, built and trained to handle the cases which the police cannot, only they do it on THEIR terms and at THEIR cost or they don't do it at all! Consisting of one of the most outrageous and deadly groups of characters ever created, the Agency will keep you on the edge of your seat and supply the thrills to keep you wanting more!
