= Steve Niles =

American comic book author and novelist (born 1965)

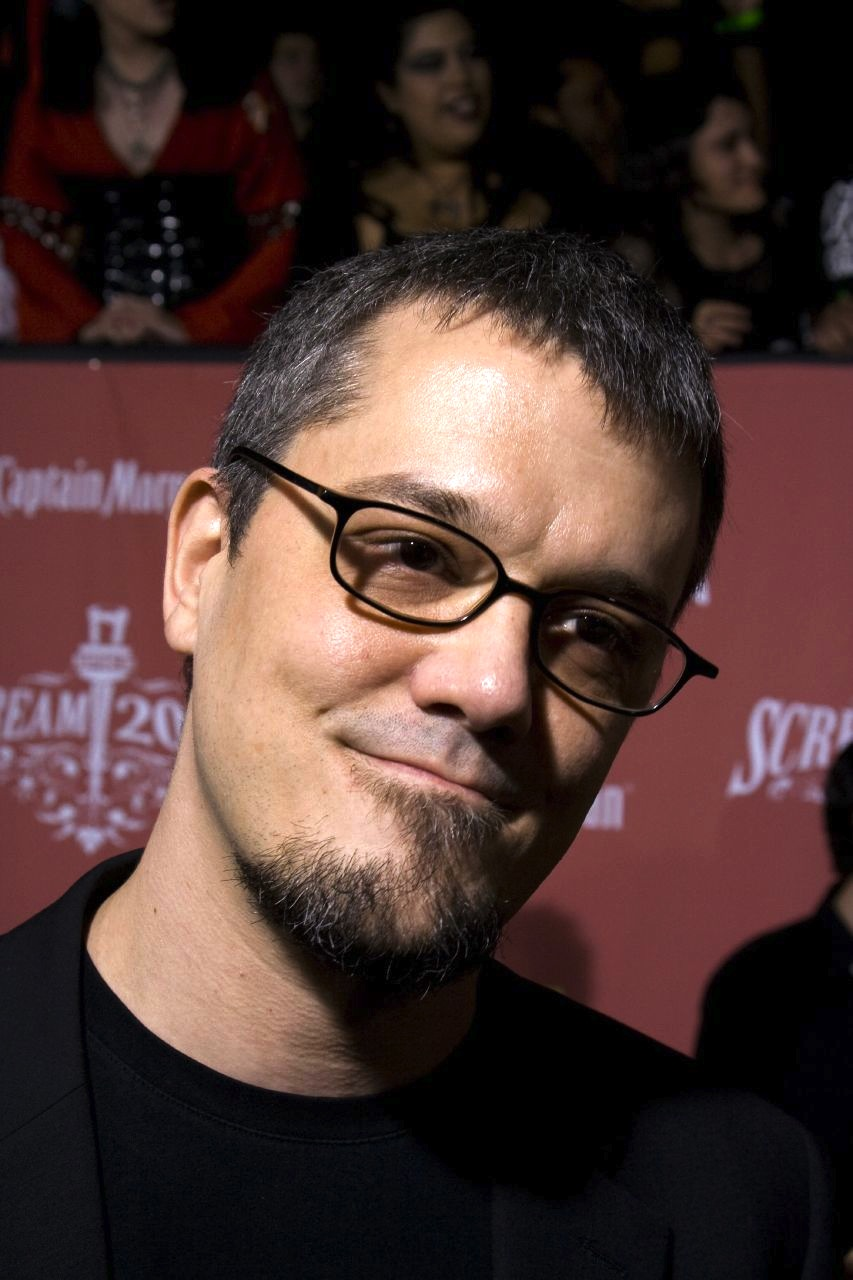
- Steve Niles at the 2007 Scream Awards
- Born: June 21, 1965 (age 61) Jackson Township; New Jersey, U.S.
- Area: Writer
- Notable works: 30 Days of Night; Criminal Macabre: A Cal McDonald Mystery; Simon Dark; Kick-Ass – The New Girl; Kick-Ass vs. Hit-Girl

Signature
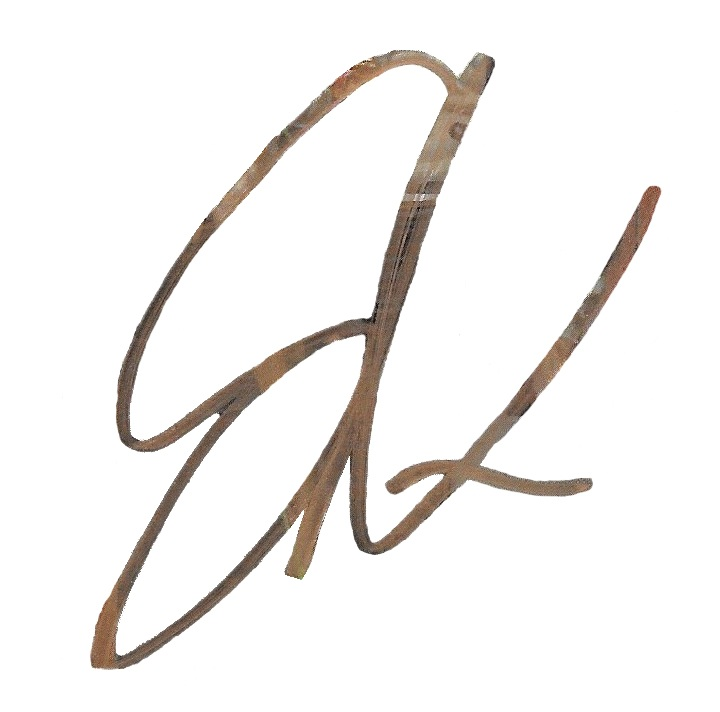

Steve Niles (born June 21, 1965) is an American comic book author, novelist and former musician, known for works such as 30 Days of Night, Criminal Macabre: A Cal McDonald Mystery, Simon Dark, Mystery Society, Batman: Gotham County Line, Kick-Ass – The New Girl, and Kick-Ass vs. Hit-Girl. Prior to his writing career, he played bass in the post-hardcore bands Gray Matter and Three.

Niles is credited among other contemporary writers as bringing horror comics back to prominence.

== Early life ==
Niles was born in Jackson, New Jersey on June 21, 1965. He was raised in the Washington, D.C. suburbs, developing various creative interests in music, writing, and making amateur films. He worked in several comic book stores and played in the punk bands Gray Matter and Three, both of which released records on Dischord Records label in the 1980s and 1990s. He often credited late night television horror host, Count Gore De Vol, who was the local horror host on Channel 20, as an early influence. In 2004 Count Gore wrote the introduction to the graphic novel Aleister Arcane, which is about the horror host of the same name. Other influences included Richard Matheson's book I Am Legend, and the works of George A. Romero, John Carpenter and Bernie Wrightson, the latter two of whom he would later work with. He had no formal education in writing following high school, explaining that he learned to write through copious reading.

== Career ==
Niles' start in the comics industry began with the formation of his self publishing company, Arcane Comix. Niles published, edited, and adapted several comics and anthologies for Eclipse Comics, working on I Am Legend in 1991. He then wrote several titles for Fantaco in the early 1990s, including Bad Moon, Fly in My Eye, and a set of lithographs for Clive Barker's Book of Blood. He worked for a year on Disney's Toy Story Web Adventures, and later worked for Todd McFarlane Productions where he wrote several issues of Spawn, Spawn: The Dark Ages. He also collaborated on Hellspawn with illustrator Ashley Wood after Brian Michael Bendis's departure, and did journalism work for Kiss Magazine, interviewing members of the band Kiss.

Niles attempted to shop around his screenplay for 30 Days of Night, but was met with rejection in Hollywood. When IDW Publishing formed, Niles sent his "reject list" to Ted Adams, who selected 30 Days of Night as a concept he was interested in. Niles and illustrator Ben Templesmith produced the first issue for free. The book did not sell well, according to Niles, but it was then that film producers took notice of it, and optioned it to be adapted into a film in 2000 or 2001.

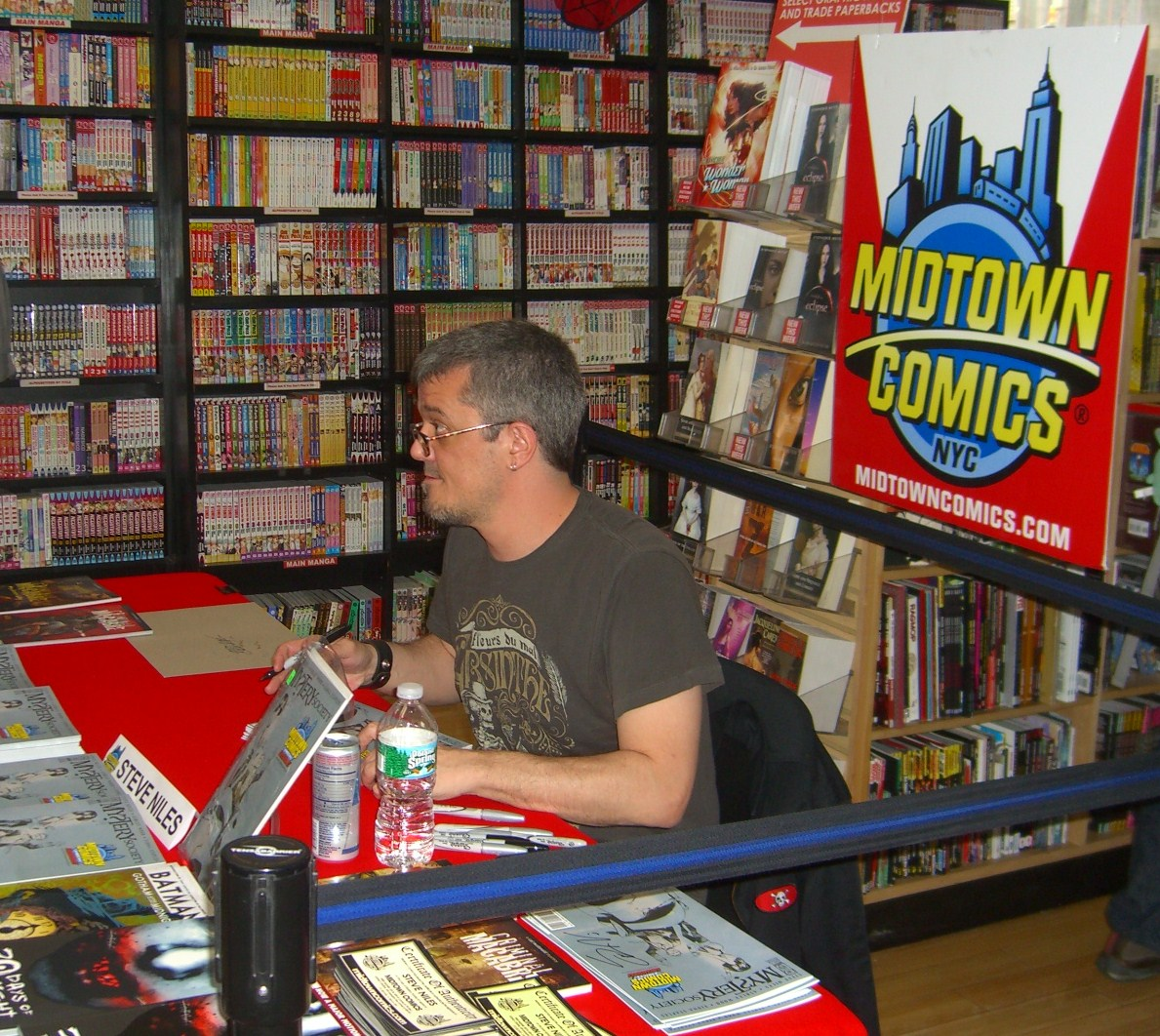
Niles at a book signing for Mystery Society #1 at Midtown Comics Times Square, May 29, 2010

In 2004 or 2005, Niles formed a joint venture production company, Creep International, with 1990s rocker and film director Rob Zombie. This project has produced two works to date: The Nail (with Nat Jones) through Dark Horse Comics, and Bigfoot (with Richard Corben) through IDW Publishing. Upon placing that venture on hiatus, he then assisted actor Thomas Jane's production company, with the intention of bringing his Criminal Macabre character Cal MacDonald to the big screen. MGM optioned the property, but it lapsed, and is currently held by Universal Pictures. Niles and Jane also co-wrote the six-issue comic book series Bad Planet for Image Comics with artists Lewis Larosa and Tim Bradstreet.

In 2006, Niles collaborated with artist Scott Hampton on a Batman miniseries, Gotham County Line, published by DC Comics. That same year, he wrote another miniseries that reinvents Steve Ditko's vintage character The Creeper with DC artist Justiniano. He is also created a new DC character with artist Scott Hampton, named Simon Dark. Dark is a vigilante hero with elements of the Frankenstein mythos who starred in eighteen issues of his own ongoing series.

In October 2007, Steve recorded an introduction to the Washington, D.C.'s International Horror Film Festival, The Spooky Movie Film Festival, in honor of opening night host, Count Gore De Vol, who was being honored for his 35 years in Washington, D.C. Posters for 30 Days of Night were given out, including one signed by Niles.

In 2007 Niles wrote a story for the DC Infinite Halloween Special called "Strange Cargo". Narrated by Poison Ivy, the story tells of Superman, Lois Lane, and Jimmy Olsen uncovering zombies in a cargo tank owned by Lex Luthor. Superman kills most of them, but takes the rest and puts them on the moon. Niles also wrote City Of Others for Dark Horse Comics with artwork done by acclaimed artist Bernie Wrightson. City Of others was a four issue story.

In 2008 Niles wrote a twelve part Batman miniseries entitled Batman: Gotham After Midnight with art by Kelley Jones. He has also written a graphic novel for Zune called The Lost Ones with various artists and City of Dust for Radical Comics. Niles is part of the Convention Monsterplaza, which is from April 9 to 11, 2010 in Marriott Burbank Convention Center. An X-Files/30 Days of Night crossover in 2010 was co-written by Niles and Adam Jones, the guitarist for the band Tool, with art by Tom Mandrake. Niles wrote the script for the Warner Bros. Interactive Entertainment produced horror first-person shooter F.E.A.R. 3.

He also appeared on Spike TV series "Deadliest Warrior", in which he represented the vampire team in the "Vampires vs Zombies" episode, as one of the Vampire experts along with Scott Bowen the author of The Vampire Survival Guide.

In December 2011, Niles spoke out against the Stop Online Piracy Act (SOPA), commenting, "SOPA does more than go after so-called 'piracy' websites...SOPA takes away all due process, shuts down any site it deems to be against the law without trial, without notification, without due process...Nobody seems to give a shit, or either they’re scared. Either way, very disappointing. I guess when it affects them they’ll get mad… I know folks are scared to speak out because a lot of us work for these companies, but we have to fight. Too much is at stake."

In 2012, Niles will be collaborating with Bernie Wrightson on Frankenstein Alive! Alive! published by IDW Publishing.

In March 2012, Niles joined Halo-8 president/Godkiller writer-creator Matt Pizzolo and Epitaph Records owner/Bad Religion guitarist-songwriter Brett Gurewitz to form Black Mask Studios with the mandate of developing new ways to support creators and reach broader audiences beyond fandom. Black Mask will launch with the release of the Occupy Comics anthology to which Niles contributed.

In December 2013, IDW announced that Niles would be collaborating with Damien Worm on a 3-issue title Monster and Madman, a tale of Frankenstein's Monster with Jack the Ripper. The first issue was published on 12 March 2014, with the remaining issues due in April and May 2014.

In March 2014, IDW announced that Niles and Worm would again be collaborating on The October Faction, Niles' first monthly ongoing title, published in late 2014. In March 2015 it was confirmed, that he will executive produce along with Wes Craven the series adaption of Christopher Mitten's comic Disciples.

== Adaptations ==
30 Days of Night was developed into a major motion picture, with Sam Raimi as producer. Niles and Ben Ketai scripted a sequel, 30 Days of Night: Dark Days, to be directed by Ketai.

Niles' Remains, a zombie story was purchased by Synthetic Cinema International in 2010. It was released as part of Chiller Network's "Chiller Presents" series as "Steve Niles' Remains.

On September 28, 2018 it was announced that Niles' comic, The October Faction would be adapted into a TV show on Netflix with a first season consisting of 10 episodes. The show premiered on Netflix on January 23, 2020. On March 30, 2020, Netflix cancelled the series after one season.

=== Upcoming projects ===
Other comics he has written that have been optioned for film include, Criminal Macabre, In the Blood, Aleister Arcane and Wake the Dead. Variety reported that Wake the Dead will be the next to enter production with Jay Russell in the director's chair. Freaks of the Heartland is being adapted by Peter Sattler and Geoff Davey, with David Gordon Green penciled in to direct it. The project is currently on hold, after differences with Overture film.

In May 2009, MTV reported that Radical Studios is developing a City of Dust movie. In November 2013, Outlier acquired the film rights of the Savage comic. In September 2014, Andrew Adamson is attached to direct the film adaptation of Breath of Bones. In June 2016, Variety reported that Jim Carrey will star in Eli Roth's film adaptation of Aleister Arcane for Amblin Entertainment.

== Bibliography ==
- Richard Matheson's I Am Legend (with Elman Brown, Eclipse Comics, 1991)
- Night of the Living Dead: London (with Clive Barker, Fantaco, 1993)
- King of the Dead (with Brian Clark and Stephen Ittner, 5-issue mini-series, Fantaco, 1994)
- Spawn: The Dark Ages (with Nat Jones, Image Comics, 2001)
- 30 Days of Night (with Ben Templesmith, IDW Publishing, 2002)
- Guns, Drugs and Monsters: A Cal McDonald Mystery (illustrated by Ashley Wood, novel, IDW Publishing, 2002, ISBN 978-0971977525)
- Fused:
  - Canned Heat (with Paul Lee, Brad Rader and Ben Templesmith, 4-issue mini-series, Image Comics, March 2002 - January 2003, tpb, 112 pages, July 2004, ISBN 1593071922)
  - Think Like a Machine (with Joshua Medors and Peter Repovski, 4-issue mini-series, Rocket Comics/Dark Horse Comics, December 2003 - March 2004, tpb, 112 pages, October 2004, ISBN 1593072635)
- Criminal Macabre (with Ben Templesmith, Dark Horse Comics and IDW Publishing, 2003)
- Dark Days (with Ben Templesmith, IDW Publishing, 2003)
- Hellspawn #'s 11–16 (with Ben Templesmith, Image Comics, 2003)
- Remains (with Kieron Dwyer, IDW Publishing, 2004)
- Freaks of the Heartland (with Greg Ruth, 6-issue limited series, Dark Horse, 2004, tpb, June 2005, 170 pages, ISBN 1-59307-029-2)
- Wake the Dead (with Chee, IDW Publishing, 2004)
- Aleister Arcane (with Breehn Burns, IDW Publishing, 2004)
- "Reckon This" (with art by Nick Stakal, in Western Tales of Terror #1, Hoarse & Buggy Productions, November 2004)
- Bigfoot (IDW Publishing, 2005)
- Giant Monster (with Nat Jones, 2-issue prestige format mini-series, Boom! Studios, 2005)
- Bad Planet (with Thomas Jane and Tim Bradstreet, Image Comics, 2005–2008)
- 28 Days Later: The Aftermath (with Nat Jones, graphic novel, Fox Atomic Comics, 2007, ISBN 0061236764)
- Criminal Macabre: The Complete Cal McDonald Stories (Dark Horse Books, 2007, ISBN 978-1-59582-118-8)
- Simon Dark (DC Comics, 2007–2008)
- Cthulhu Tales (with Chee, Shane Oakley, Boom! Studios, 2008, ongoing, first tpb December 2008, ISBN 1-934506-51-6)
- Dead, She Said (with Bernie Wrightson, 3-issue mini-series, IDW Publishing, May–September 2008)
- The Lost Ones (with art by Gary Panter, Dr. Revolt, Kime Buzzelli, and Morning Breath, graphic novel, Zune, 2008)
- Epilogue (with Kyle Hotz, 4-issue mini-series, IDW Publishing, September–December 2008)
- City of Dust (with Zid, 5-issue limited series, Radical Comics, October 2008 – March 2009)
- Star Wars: Halloween Special 2009 "Planet of the Dead" (with artist Davide Fabbri, Dark Horse Comics, free give away with Previews catalog)
- Mystery Society (with Fiona Staples, 5-issue limited series, IDW Publishing, May–October 2010)
- X-Files/30 Days of Night (with Tom Mandrake, 6-issue limited series, IDW Publishing/WildStorm, September 2010 - February 2011)
- Doc Macabre (with Bernie Wrightson, 3-issue mini-series, IDW Publishing, December 2010 - February 2011)
- Lot 13 (with Glenn Fabry, 5-issue limited series, DC Comics, October 2012 — March 2013)
- Winnebago Graveyard (with artist, Alison Sampson, 4-issue mini-series, Image Comics, June 2017 - September 2017)
- Lonesome Days, Savage Nights (TKO Studios, 2020)
