= Eric Powell (comics) =

American comic book writer/artist (born 1975)

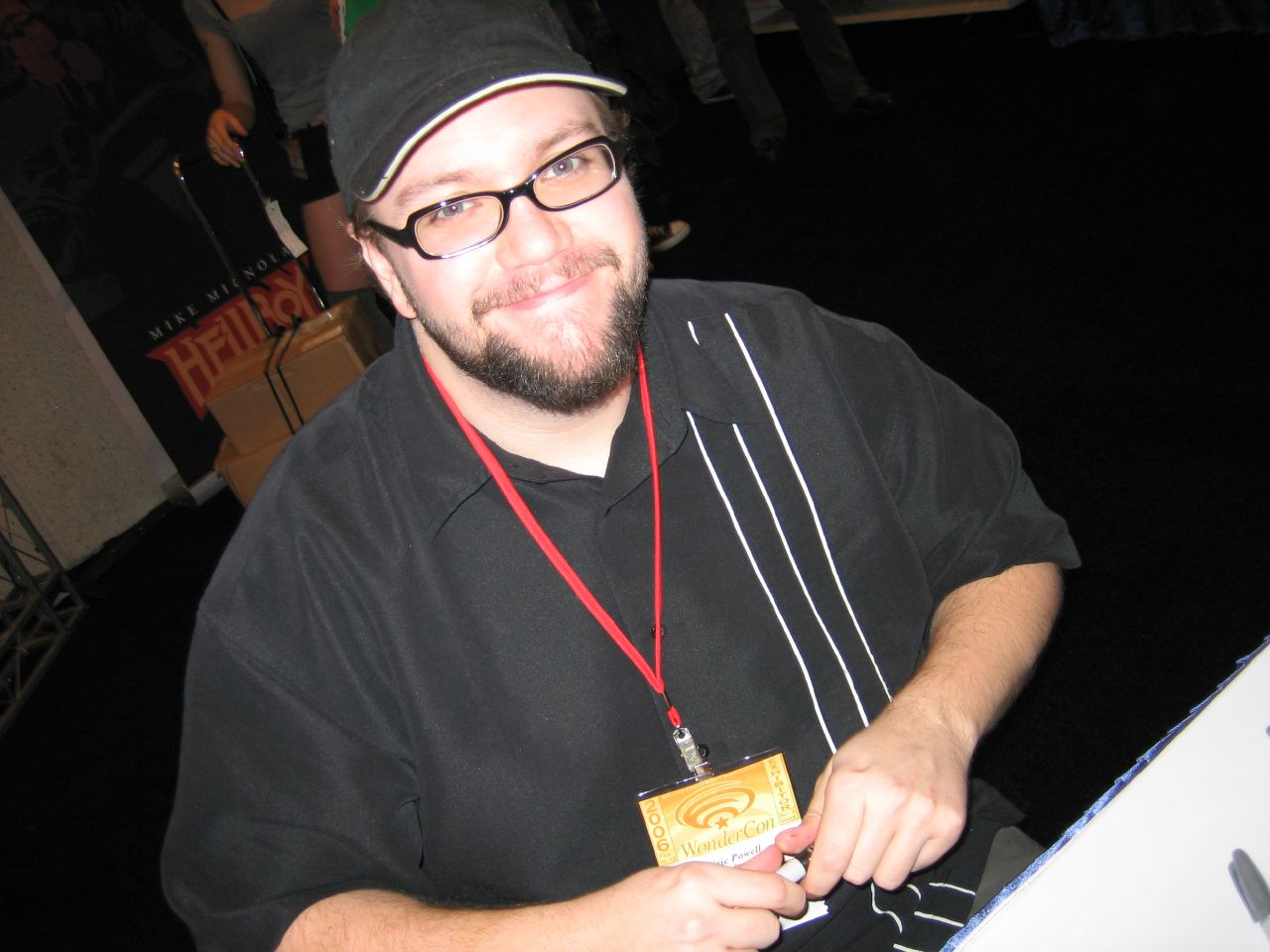
- Eric Powell at Wondercon 2006
- Born: March 3, 1975 (age 51)
- Areas: Writer, Artist
- Notable works: The Goon
- Awards: Eisner Awards (2004, 2005, 2008)

Eric Powell (born March 3, 1975) is an American comic book writer/artist, best known as the creator of The Goon.

== Career ==
Powell has written and provided artwork for Dark Horse, DC Comics and Marvel Comics, but is most regarded for his original series The Goon, which debuted from the small publisher Avatar Press. Powell quickly switched to self-publishing under the moniker Albatross Exploding Funny Books, before being picked up by Dark Horse Comics after only a handful of issues. The Goon's quality was recognized with an Eisner Award in 2004 for Best Single Issue (Dark Horse The Goon #1) as well as an International Horror Guild award. The following year, Powell won Eisner's Best Humor Publication and Best Continuing Series awards.

He is a featured interviewee in the movie Independents.

Powell co-wrote the first two volumes of IDW's Godzilla: Kingdom of Monsters with Tracy Marsh.

In 2022, Powell's self-publishing venture, Albatross Funny Books, was moved to Dark Horse Comics as an imprint, bringing along such titles as The Goon, Hillbilly, Big Man Plans, Galaktikon (Brendon Small), and Pug Davis (Rebecca Sugar).

== Awards ==
- 2004:
  - International Horror Guild Award for Best Illustrated Narrative (The Goon #1-4)
  - Eisner Award for Best Single Issue (The Goon #1)
- 2005:
  - Eisner Award for Best Humor Publication (The Goon)
  - Eisner Award for Best Continuing Series (The Goon)
- 2008:
  - Eisner Award for Best Writer/Artist—Humor (The Goon)
  - Eisner Award for Best Painter/Multimedia Artist (The Goon: Chinatown)
- 2024"
  - Inkpot Award

== Bibliography ==
The Goon Volume 3: Heaps of Ruination (February 2005)

- Big Man Plans (with writer Tim Weisch) (Image Comics, 2015) — 4-issue limited series
- Billy the Kid's Old-Timey Oddities (with artist Kyle Hotz, TPB collects Billy the Kid's Old-Timey Oddities #1-4, Dark Horse, 2006, ISBN 1-59307-448-4)
- Chimichanga #1-3 (with artist Stephanie Buscema) (Albatross Exploding Funny Books, 2009–2010)
- Conan #28 (with writer Kurt Busiek, Dark Horse, 2006)
- The Dark Horse Book of the Dead — contributed the short story "The Wallace Expedition", TPB, Dark Horse, 2006, ISBN 1-59307-281-3
- Did You Hear What Eddie Gein Done? (with Harold Schechter) (Albatross Funny Books, 2021)
- The Goon:
  - Best Cellars #1 — 1st appearance of Monster Boy, a Goon prototype
  - Avatar Illustrated 1998 (Avatar Press)
  - Dreamwalker #0 (Avatar Press) — The Goon preview, a 4-page back-up story later reprinted in The Goon #1
  - Dreamwalker #1 (avatar Press) (Carousel) — 3-page preview of The Goon (came out after Goon #1)
  - The Goon #1-3 (Avatar Press) — issue #1 features the first appearance of The Goon, Franky, Joey the ball, and Zombie Priest; issue #3 is the origin of the Goon
  - The Goon #1-Present (Dark Horse)
  - The Goon: Chinatown (Dark Horse, 2007) ISBN 1-59307-833-1
  - The Goon: Fancy Pants Edition Volume 1 — limited edition hardcover collecting The Goon #1-2 (self published), #1,3,5,9 (Dark Horse Comics, 2005) ISBN 1-59307-426-3
  - The Goon: Fancy Pants Edition Volume 2: The Rise and Fall of the Diabolical Dr. Alloy (Dark Horse, 2008) — limited edition hardcover ISBN 1-59307-918-4
  - The Goon: Rough Stuff (Dark Horse, 2004) — TPB collects The Goon #1-3 (Avatar Press) ISBN 1-59307-086-1
  - The Goon Volume 1: Nothin' But Misery (Dark Horse, 2003) — TPB collects The Goon #1-4, The Goon Color Special (self-published), ISBN 1-56971-998-5
  - The Goon Volume 2: My Murderous Childhood (and Other Grievous Yarns) (Dark Horse, 2004) — TPB collects The Goon #1-4 ISBN 1-59307-109-4)
  - The Goon Volume 3: Heaps Of Ruination (Dark Horse, 2005) — TPB collects The Goon #5-8 ISBN 1-59307-292-9
  - The Goon Volume 4: Virtue and the Grim Consequences Thereof (Dark Horse, 2006) — TPB collects The Goon #9-13 ISBN 1-59307-456-5
  - The Goon Volume 5: Wicked Inclinations (Dark Horse, 2006) — TPB collects The Goon #14-18 ISBN 1-59307-646-0
  - The Goon Volume 6: Chinatown (Dark Horse, 2007) ISBN 1-59307-833-1
  - The Goon Volume 7: A Place of Heartache and Grief (Dark Horse, 2009) — TPB collects The Goon #19-23 ISBN 1-59582-311-5
  - The Goon Volume 8: Those That is Damned (Dark Horse, 2009) — TPB collects The Goon #24-27 ISBN 1-59582-324-7
  - The Goon Volume 9: Calamity of Conscience (Dark Horse, 2009) — TPB collects The Goon #28-31 ISBN 1-59582-346-8
  - Satan’s Sodomy Baby (Dark Horse, 2007, ASIN B0012393S4)
- Hillbilly (Albatross Exploding Funny, 2016–current)
- Marvel Monsters: Devil Dinosaur (Marvel Comics, 2005, ASIN B002YB9Y2I)
- Spook House (Albatross Funnybooks, 2016–2017) — anthology with other creators
- Superman: Escape from Bizarro World (with writers Geoff Johns and Richard Donner, TPB collects "Action Comics" #855-857, DC Comics, 2007, ISBN 978-1401220334)

=== Books illustrated ===
- Billy Hooten: Owlboy (with author Thomas E. Sniegoski, published by Yearling Books, 2008, ISBN 978-0-440-42180-1)

=== Cover work ===
- Arkham Asylum: Living Hell #1-6 (DC Comics)
- Billy the Kid's Old-Timey Oddities #1-4 (Dark Horse Comics)
- Billy the Kid's Old-Timey Oddities trade collection (Dark Horse Comics)
- Dethklok vs. The Goon (Dark Horse Comics)
- Freddy vs. Jason vs. Ash (DC Comics/Dynamite Entertainment)
- Fused: Think Like a Machine #1-2 (Dark Horse Comics))
- Fused: Think Like a Machine trade collection (Dark Horse Comics)
- Marvel Monsters #1-4 (Marvel Comics)
- Marvel Monsters trade collection (Marvel Comics)
- Marvel Westerns: Western #1 (Marvel Comics)
- Marvel Westerns: Kid Colt and the Arizona #2 (Marvel Comics)
- Marvel Westerns: The Two Gun #3 (Marvel Comics)
- Metalocalypse #1-3 (Dark Horse Comics)
- Super-Villain Team-Up/MODOK'S 11 #1 (Marvel Comics)
- Swamp Thing #21-29 (DC Comics)
- Tales of the Vampires #3 (Dark Horse Comics)
- Universal Monsters: Cavalcade of Horror trade collection (Dark Horse Comics)
