= Simon Dark =

- Simon Dark

Publication information
- Publisher: DC Comics
- First appearance: Simon Dark #1 (October 2007)
- Created by: Steve Niles (writer); Scott Hampton (artist)

In-story information
- Notable aliases: The Mayor
- Abilities: Impervious to Bullets and Amputation, Super-strength, Intelligence, Arcane knowledge

Simon Dark is a fictional character who appears in American comic books published by DC Comics, with an ongoing eponymous series beginning in October 2007 and ending in 2009.

While ostensibly set in Gotham City, the comic focused exclusively on Simon Dark and his narrative, with no cross-overs and only a few casual comments to indicate he and Batman were active in the same city.

His name is also the name of a nursery rhyme in the city which he lives:
"Lurks in shadows, hides in the park.
Simon. Simon.
Simon Dark.
If you're good, he'll stay away
If you're bad, he'll make you pay
Lurks in shadows. Hides in the park.
Simon. Simon.
Simon Dark".
- The nursery rhyme of "What Simon (Dark) Does".

== Fictional character biography ==
When he initially appears, Simon Dark has amnesia. He exhibits some super-human abilities such as enhanced speed and agility, as well as extraordinary strength. He acts as a protector of a neighborhood called "the Village" in Gotham City; for its part the neighborhood is happy for their odd protector's presence.

As the comic progresses it is revealed that Simon Dark was created from the bodies of 20 boys by a desperate medical genius who turned to a dark cult for assistance. Simon, and several other characters in the comic, were created using science and magic but only Simon was created with a purpose; to stop the dark cult that created him.

Eventually Simon transforms from a scared and confused creature with a childlike mentality into a powerful and confident supernatural being with a laundry list of vaguely defined occult superpowers, many of which are only used once. He is resistant to damage (bullets hurt but don't seem to seriously impair him), extremely strong, can read minds, pasts and futures by touching people and can change his appearance (or at least his face) to hide his scarred face. He can cast magical rituals that allow him to see far away places and the future, and transport himself and other people to other dimensions. Once, he uses a magical rock like a floating high speed weapon, slamming through enemies like a bullet under his mental direction. He also has three shapechanging servants he calls his 'familiars', who he liberates from the evil cult; they are physically very powerful.

Apparently, he can also bring dead people back to life by sacrificing some of the 20 souls that constitute him.

He also becomes the magical overseer of Gotham (confusingly called The Mayor), who controls the flow of supernatural creatures into the city.

== Collected editions ==
The series was collected into trade paperbacks:

- What Simon Does (collects Simon Dark #1-6, 144 pages, August 2008, ISBN 1-4012-1849-0)
- Ashes (collects Simon Dark #7-12, 144 pages, February 2009, ISBN 1-4012-2170-X)
- The Game of Life (collects Simon Dark #13-18, 144 pages, December 2009, ISBN 1-4012-2504-7)
