= Nick Stakal =

- Areas: Penciller, Inker
- Notable works: Silent Hill: The Grinning Man; Silent Hill: Dead/Alive

Nick Stakal is a comics artist who is best known for providing the artwork for two of the Silent Hill comic books, Silent Hill: The Grinning Man, and Silent Hill: Dead/Alive.
