= Thomas Ott =

Swiss comic artist (born 1966)

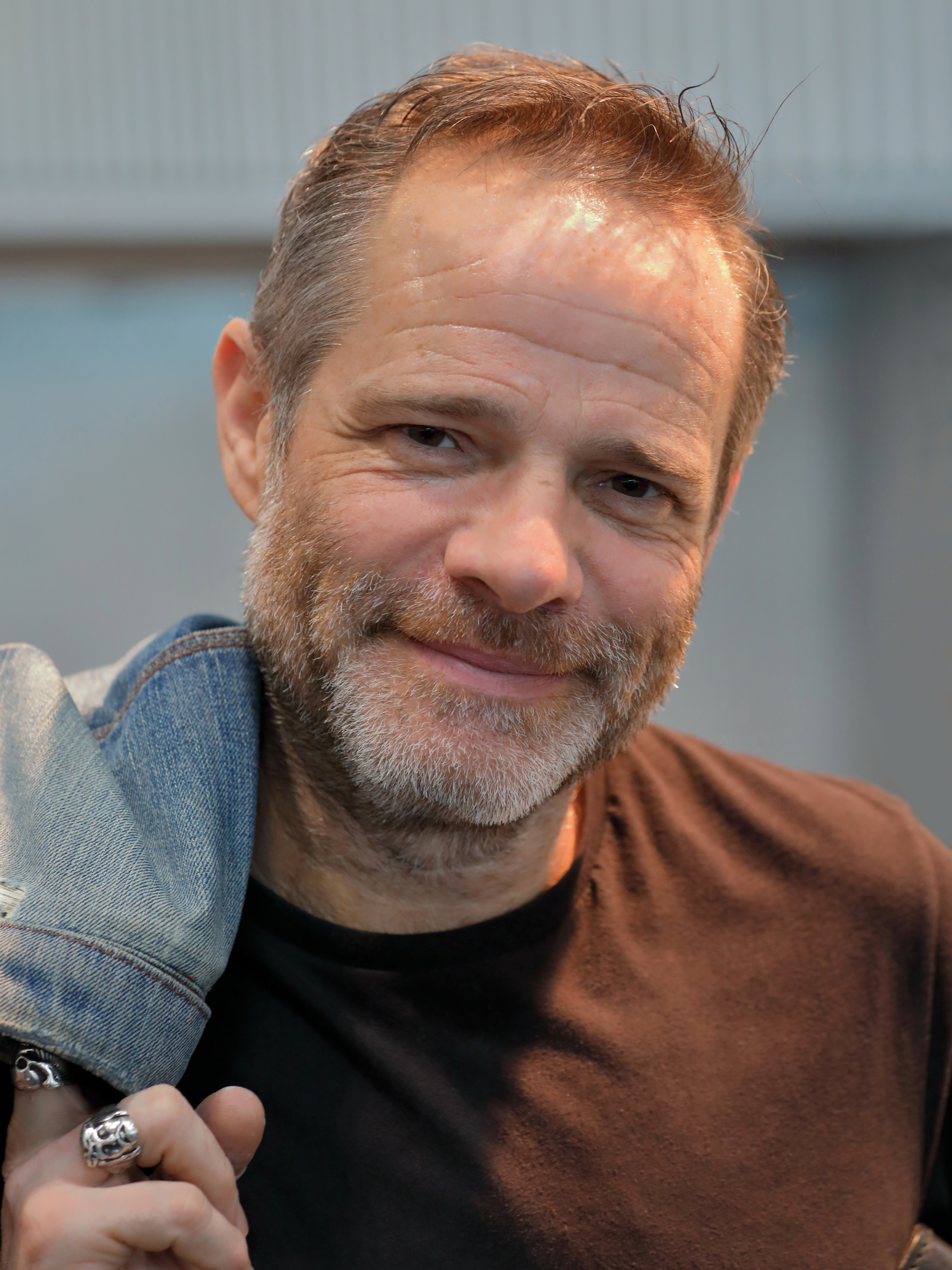
Thomas Ott (2019)

Thomas Ott (born 10 June 1966) is a Swiss comic artist. His comics have been published in German-speaking countries, France, the United States, Spain, Denmark, Italy and other places.

Ott's often wordless comics feature a dark, grim atmosphere; he works mainly with cutters and scratchboard.

== Biography ==
After graduating from the School of Design in Zurich in 1987, Ott worked as a comic artist in Zurich and Paris. His first book, Tales of Error, was published by Edition Moderne in 1989. Other books followed with the same publisher as well as the French publisher L'Association. He has worked for Strapazin, Lapin, L'Écho des Savanes and various newspapers, among other publications.

From 1998 to June 2001, Ott studied film at the Zurich School of Art and Design. His diploma film was the 15-minute Sjeki vatcsh!.

The artist's favourite technique is scratchboarding: “it makes images emerge from multiple layers of black ink by literally ‘scratching’ them with a nib, specifically a Japanese cutter. A painstakingly delicate work that leaves no room for error, in which Ott is now a master”. The dark, distressing and suffocating atmospheres of his stories have received critical acclaim. Ott skilfully combines “fragments of detective fiction, noir and horror. For him, popular genres, such as fairy tales, are a universal basis in which everyone can recognize themselves”. Some add that “despite his lines steeped in black humour, one would do him wrong to see them merely as a parody of the horror genre [...] Ott empathises with the underdogs and has a certain sensitivity to truly tragic stories.” And again: “For years, the Swiss comic artist has been delivering the darkest visions of the absurd side of modern civilisation.”

His comic Cinema Panopticum was published in 2005 and contains four horror short stories and a frame story.

In 2013, Ott released another new work after three years: Dark Country is the story of a nightmarish honeymoon and is a standalone adaptation of the 2008 film of the same name by screenwriter Tab Murphy and director and Hollywood actor Thomas Jane (The Punisher). Jane himself invited Ott to tell his film as a comic.

In 2015, Ott co-founded the Swiss doom metal band Tar Pond. The other two founding members were former Celtic Frost bassist Martin Eric Ain (replaced by Monika Schori after his death in 2017) and former Coroner drummer Markus "Marky" Edelmann. Ott has performed vocals for the band since its founding, including on both of its studio albums, Protocol of Constant Sadness (2020) and Petrol (2023). He also designs the band's t-shirts.

Ott taught for a decade at the Zurich University of the Arts, deciding “just before the first wave of the pandemic” to resign in order to work as an author and illustrator.

In 2020 he was awarded a scholarship from the Pro Helvetia foundation.

His latest work, The Forest (2022), is an illustrated tale which depicts "the journey of a child facing and accepting the loss of a beloved person.”

== Works ==
- Tales of Error, 1989, Edition Moderne
- Phantom der Superheld, 1994, Edition Moderne
- Greetings from Hellville, 1995, Edition Moderne
- Dead End, 1996, Edition Moderne
- La douane, 1996, L’Association
- La bête à cinq doigts, 1996, L'Association
- La grande famiglia, 1997, L'Association
- t.o.t.t., 2002, Edition Moderne
- Cinema Panopticum, 2005, Edition Moderne
- The Number 73304-23-4153-6-96-8, Zürich: Edition Moderne 2008, 2nd edition 2013. ISBN 978-3-03731-025-0
- Unplugged. Das Skizzenbuch, Zürich: Edition Stephan Witschi, 2009
- R.I.P. Best of 1985-2004, Zürich: Edition Moderne 2010. ISBN 3037310529
- Dark Country, Zürich: Edition Moderne 2013. ISBN 978-3-03731-114-1
- Black Island, Zürich: Hammer-Verlag 2013
- A Hell of a Woman (Jim Thompson), Editions la Baconnière, 2014
- Louis Vuitton - Travel Book - Route 66, Editions Louis Vuitton, 2017
- Wo die Liebe hinfällt (illustrations by Thomas Ott), Diogenes Verlag, 2018
- The Forest, translated from La Forêt, published in France, 2020
- Der Wald. Carlsen, Hamburg, 2021, ISBN 978-3-551-76020-3

== Exhibitions ==
- 2009: Cinema Panopticum – Thomas Ott, Cineteca di Bologna
- 2010: Fumetto
- 2019: Es zog mich durch die Bilder, Kubin@Nextcomic, Landesgalerie Linz, with works by ATAK, Brigitta Falkner, Anke Feuchtenberger, Nicolas Mahler, Thomas Ott, Christina Röckl, Franz Suess, Edda Strobl and Alfred Kubin
- 2019: Black Holes, with Simone Baumann, Galerie Stephan Witschi, Zurich
- 2021: La forêt, Galerie Martel, Paris
- 2025 "Thomas Ott: From Scratch" (Cartoonmuseum Basel – Centre for Narrative Art, Basel, Switzerland)

== Awards ==
- 1996: Max & Moritz Prize at the Comic-Salon Erlangen for Best German-speaking comic artist
- 2006: Attilio Micheluzzi Award for best foreign language comics with Cinema Panopticum
- 2017: Swiss Federal Office of Culture Grand Award for Design
- 2020: Trophée de l’édition for best book production with The Forest
