= Jeff Koke =

American artist and writer

Jeff Koke is an American writer, graphic designer and business owner currently living in Austin, Texas. He is best known for his writing work for Steve Jackson Games in the 1990s, including GURPS Vampire: The Masquerade, an adaptation of the well-known Vampire: The Masquerade roleplaying game, and GURPS Black Ops (co-written with S. John Ross).

Jeff Koke worked for Steve Jackson Games as managing editor, senior designer and as a freelance writer from 1991 until 1997, when he left the company to work in the graphic design field. His work for Steve Jackson Games won him two Origins Awards, Best Roleplaying Supplement for GURPS Vampire in 1993 and Best Graphic Representation of a Roleplaying Game for In Nomine in 1997.

In June 2010, he published his first fiction novel, Princess Alex and the Sapphire Crown, a young adult modern fantasy with a main character based in part on the author's own daughter, Alexandra.

He earned a bachelor's degree in English from Texas State University in San Marcos in 1991 and a master's degree in English from the University of Texas in 1994. He currently runs a business in the graphic design field, Jeff Koke Design, a design and marketing firm in Austin, Texas.

== Writing credits ==
- GURPS Vampire: The Masquerade, 1993
- GURPS Time Travel Adventures, 1994
- GURPS Supers Adventures, 1995
- GURPS Black Ops, 1997
- Princess Alex and the Sapphire Crown, 2010 ISBN 0-557-47546-5
