= Tim Bradstreet =

American artist and illustrator

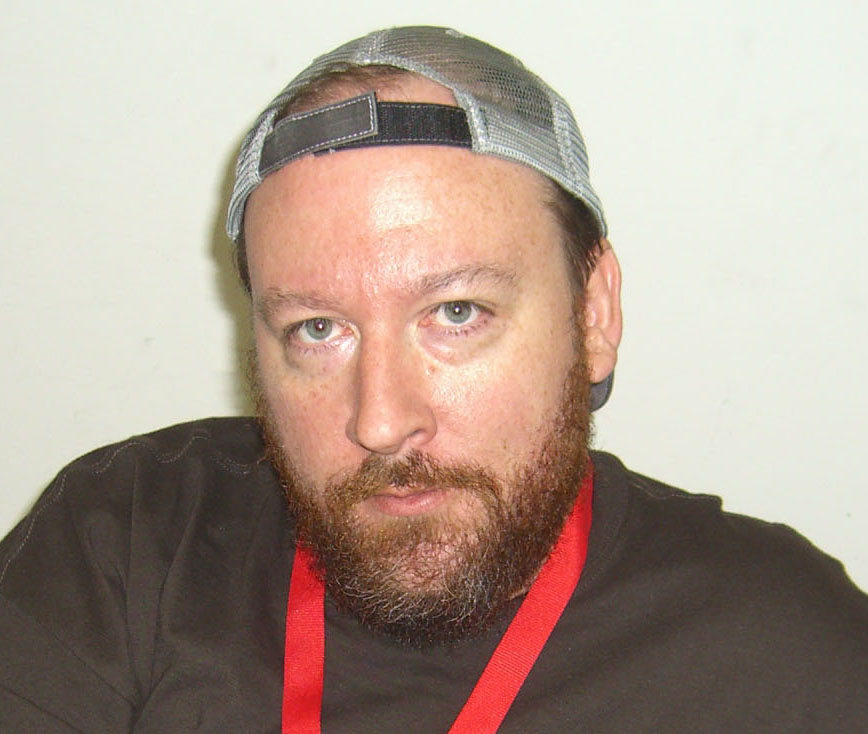
- Bradstreet in 2009
- Born: Tim Bradstreet; February 16, 1967 (age 59) Cheverly, Maryland
- Areas: Cover artist; penciller; inker
- Awards: Inkpot Award (2012)

Tim Bradstreet (born February 16, 1967) is an American artist and illustrator.

== Early life ==
Tim Bradstreet was born February 16, 1967, in Cheverly, Maryland. He graduated high school in 1985.

== Career ==
Bradstreet entered the comic book industry in 1990, working with Tim Truman on Dragon Chiang.

Bradstreet's work on White Wolf Publishing's Vampire: The Masquerade garnered him much critical praise. This, in turn, led to the addition of many major comic book publishers to his clientele. He has since drawn for scores of comics-related projects including Dark Horse's Hard Looks and Another Chance to Get It Right (with author Andrew Vachss), Star Wars, Clive Barker's Age of Desire, Marvel's The Punisher and Blade, and Vertigo's Gangland, Unknown Soldier, Human Target, and Hellblazer.

Detail from the cover to Hellblazer #214 (2005) by Bradstreet

Bradstreet's work has also extended to games of many types. His work on role-playing games has included Game Designers' Workshop's Twilight 2000 and FASA's Shadowrun. He was involved in art design for the Activision's Vampire: Bloodlines video game. He illustrated cards in Last Unicorn Games' collectible card game Heresy: Kingdom Come.

Bradstreet was awarded the 1996 International Horror Guild Award for Best Artist. He was also nominated for a 2005 IHG Award for his Hellblazer covers. Bradstreet has also been nominated for the 2002 Best Cover Artist Eisner Award for his Hellblazer covers.

In 2000, he joined director Guillermo del Toro as a conceptual artist helping work on the visual design for the film Blade II. In 2003, Bradstreet worked on a number of movie posters for the Marvel/Lions Gate film, The Punisher as well as the cover for The Punisher: Countdown mini-comic that was packaged with the original DVD release. In 2006 Bradstreet provided artwork for a black and white stop motion animated scene set in Kuwait for the extended cut DVD. Bradstreet has also done posters for the films – Punisher: War Zone, Dark Country, Give 'Em Hell, Malone, and I Melt with You. He has done a poster for the TV Series The Expanse.

Bradstreet was also the regular cover artist for two books, Marvel's The Punisher and Vertigo/DC's Hellblazer. He has created over 70 covers for both books in the past five years.

In 2006, Bradstreet created the album art for British heavy metal band Iron Maiden's album A Matter of Life and Death, which featured a mob of skeleton soldiers walking in front of a tank and features Eddie, the band's mascot at the top of the tank with a Thompson M1/M1A1 pointed up in the air. In 2016, he appeared on Brad Jones' Midnight Screenings to discuss the movie Why Him?

== Reception ==
In the May 1994 edition of Dragon (Issue #205), Rick Swan specifically mentioned Bradstreet's work in GURPS Vampire: The Masquerade, saying, "The illustrations are among the best I've ever seen in an RPG product, particularly those by Tim Bradstreet. His depiction of a vampire feasting on the wrist of a fellow burn-out [...] evokes both the horrors of addiction and the intimacy of a shared secret. White Wolf, Steve Jackson, or Bradstreet himself ought to market it as a poster."

In his 2023 book Monsters, Aliens, and Holes in the Ground, RPG historian Stu Horvath reviewed the dystopian role-playing game Shadowrun. Horvath noted that "Tim Bradstreet ... [delivers] some stellar, street-level illustration work." Horvath went on to describe Bradstreet's work in Vampire: the Masquerade as "gritty, world-defining illustrations."

== Bibliography ==
=== Interiors ===
- Dragon Chiang (1991) one-shot (inker)
- Hawkworld (1993) #30–32 (inker)
- Aliens: Music of the Spears (1994) #1–4 (inker)
- Barb Wire: Ace of Spades (1996) #1–4 (inker)
- Rune: Hearts of Darkness (1996) #1–3 (inker)
- Evil Ernie: Destroyer (1997) #1–3 (inker)
- John Constantine, Hellblazer (1999) #141 (penciller, inker)
- Batman/Deathblow: After the Fire (2003) #1–3 (inker)
- Bad Planet (2005–2008) #1–6 (inker)
- Black Panther (2006) #16 (inker)
- Clive Barker's Age of Desire (2009) OGN (penciller, inker)
- Robert E. Howard's Savage Sword (2010) #1 (penciller, inker)

=== Covers ===
- Aliens: Music of the Spears (1994) #1–4
- Evil Ernie: Destroyer (1997) #1–3
- Unknown Soldier (1997) #1–4
- Transmetropolitan (1997) #37–39
- Gangland (1998) #1
- Xena: Warrior Princess (1999) #2–3
- Human Target (1999) #1–4
- John Constantine, Hellblazer (1999–2006) #134–143, #146–215
- Star Trek: The Next Generation – Perchance to Dream (2000) #1–4
- The Punisher: Welcome Back, Frank (2000–2001) #1–12
- JLA: Black Baptism (2001) #1–4
- Action Comics (2001) #775
- The Punisher (2001–2004) #1–37
- Blade (2002) #1–6
- Dial M for Monster: A Collection of Cal McDonald Mystery Stories (2003) novel
- The Punisher (2004–2008) #1–60
- The Punisher: The Cell (2005) one-shot
- Bad Planet (2005–2008) #4
- Jonah Hex (2006) #5
- The Punisher: The Tyger (2006) one-shot
- Black Panther (2006) #16
- Criminal Macabre: Two Red Eyes (2006–2007) #1–4
- Sandman Mystery Theatre: Sleep of Reason (2007) #1–5
- 28 Days Later: The Aftermath (2007) TPB
- Supernatural: Origins (2007) #1
- Criminal Macabre: My Demon Baby (2007–2008) #1–4
- Scalped (2008) #18–20
- Wolverine: Flies to a Spider (2008) one-shot
- Criminal Macabre: Cell Block 666 (2008–2009) #1–4
- The Spirit: The New Adventures (2009) #6
- 28 Days Later (2009) #1–8
- The Punisher: Naked Kill (2009) one-shot
- Clive Barker's Age of Desire (2009) OGN
- Luke Cage Noir (2009–2010) #1–4
- Punisher Noir (2009–2010) #1–4
- The Amory Wars: In Keeping Secrets of Silent Earth: 3 (2010) #1
- Motel Hell (2010) #1–2
- Punisher MAX: Get Castle (2010) one-shot
- Punisher MAX: Hot Rods of Death (2010) one-shot
- Punisher MAX: Tiny Ugly World (2010) one-shot
- Internecine (2010) novel
- Iron Siege (2010–2011) #1–3
- Bullseye: Perfect Game (2011) #1–2
- Iron Man: The Rapture (2011) #1–4
- Jennifer Blood (2011–2012) #1–20
- Robert E. Howard's Savage Sword (2011) #2
- Star Trek (2011) #1-ongoing
- Hellraiser (2011–2012) #1–21
- True Blood (2012) #1–6
- Jericho: Season 4 (2012–2013) #1–2
- Hellraiser: The Road Below (2012) #1–4
- Hellraiser: The Dark Watch (2013) #1–ongoing
- The Shadow (2013) #13–ongoing
