= Dexter Fletcher =

English actor and director (born 1966)

Dexter Fletcher OBE
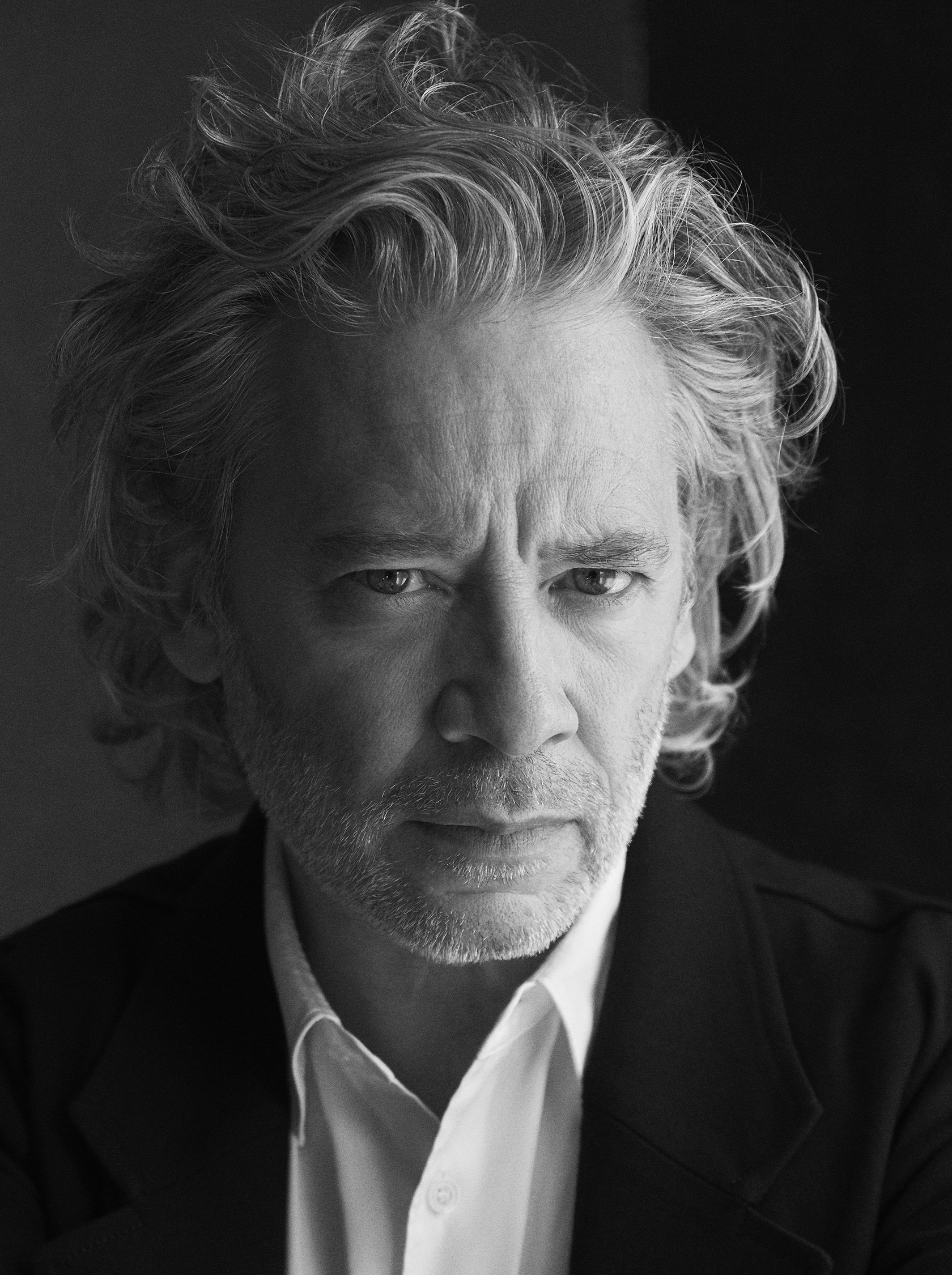
- Fletcher in 2019
- Born: 31 January 1966 (age 60); Enfield, Greater London, England
- Occupations: Film director; actor
- Years active: 1976–present
- Spouse: Dalia Ibelhauptaitė (m. 1997)

Dexter Fletcher OBE (born 31 January 1966) is an English film director and actor. He has appeared in Guy Ritchie's Lock, Stock and Two Smoking Barrels, as well as in television shows such as the comedy drama Hotel Babylon and the HBO series Band of Brothers and, earlier in his career, starred as Spike Thomson in the comedy drama Press Gang. His earliest acting role was in the 1973 comedy drama film Steptoe and Son Ride Again.

Fletcher made his directorial debut with Wild Bill (2011), and also directed Sunshine on Leith (2013) and Eddie the Eagle (2015). He replaced Bryan Singer as director of Bohemian Rhapsody, a biopic about the band Queen, released in October 2018; due to DGA rules, he received executive producer credit. In 2019, he directed Rocketman, a biographical film based on the life and music of performer Elton John.

== Career ==
Fletcher trained at the Anna Scher Theatre. His first film part was as Baby Face in Bugsy Malone (1976). He made his stage début the following year in a production of A Midsummer Night's Dream. As a youth actor he was regularly featured in British productions in the early 1980s, including The Long Good Friday, The Elephant Man and The Bounty. In 1987, Fletcher was cast in Lionheart. In 1988, he won the Stars de Demain prize at the inaugural Geneva Cineme Fête for The Raggedy Rawney. As an adult he appeared on television as the rebellious teenager Spike Thomson in Press Gang and in Murder Most Horrid (1991) with Dawn French. He has also starred in the films Caravaggio (1986), The Rachel Papers (1989), Lock, Stock and Two Smoking Barrels (1998), Layer Cake (2004), AffirmFilm's Solomon as Rehoboam and Universal's Doom.

He appeared as Puck in Britten's A Midsummer Night's Dream in 1981 at Glyndebourne Opera and on their autumn tour, and then again in 1990 in an Opera London production at Sadler's Wells, subsequently recorded by Virgin Classics.

On television, Fletcher has appeared in the major HBO drama, Band of Brothers and in a supporting role in the BBC One historical drama The Virgin Queen (US PBS 2005, UK 2006). He also appeared in Kylie Minogue's music video for "Some Kind of Bliss" (1997). He starred on BBC One in a series based on Imogen Edwards-Jones's book Hotel Babylon that ran for four series before being cancelled in 2009. He also appeared in "The Booby and the Beast", an episode in the second series of the BBC's series Robin Hood and in the 2008 radio series The Way We Live Right Now. He appeared in the Bo' Selecta! spinoff A Bear's Tail as The Scriptwriter. He played a brief role in the BBC series New Tricks, in the episode "Final Curtain", as an actor named Tommy Jackson. In 2009, Fletcher also appeared in Misfits as Nathan Young's dad, reprising the role in 2010 for the second series.

Fletcher has been the voice for McDonald's television adverts and (feigning a US accent) is the narrator of The Game audio book written by Neil Strauss. He also narrated the Five series Airforce Afghanistan, as well as the Chop Shop: London Garage series on the Discovery Channel. In 1993, he was the voice of Prince Cinders in the short animated comedy of the same name. Also in 1993, he was the uncredited UNIT soldier narrator of the UNIT Recruiting Film – a five-minute spoof piece that preceded a BBC1 repeat of the sixth and final episode of Doctor Who story Planet of the Daleks. In 2014 he narrated the BBC1 show Del Boys and Dealers. In 1998, Fletcher featured on the song "Here Comes the Flood" from the album Fin de Siecle by The Divine Comedy.

=== Directing ===
Fletcher's debut as a director was for a script he co-wrote, Wild Bill, which was released on 20 March 2012. His second film as director is a musical film by Stephen Greenhorn, Sunshine on Leith, based around the Proclaimers songs, which was released on 4 October 2013. In 2015, he directed the feature film Eddie the Eagle. In December 2017, Fletcher was announced as Bryan Singer's replacement director on the Queen biopic Bohemian Rhapsody. The film was released in November 2018. While Fletcher had helped finish the film, Singer received sole directing credit and he received executive producer credit. Fletcher directed the 2019 biopic Rocketman about the life and music of Elton John. In February 2020, he signed on to direct a reboot of The Saint for Paramount Pictures. He also directed the Apple TV+ feature film Ghosted, which was released in April 2023.

== Personal life ==
Fletcher was born in Enfield, the youngest of three boys, in north London, and grew up with his brothers in Woodford Green and Palmers Green; his parents were teachers.

In 1997, he married Lithuanian film and theatre director Dalia Ibelhauptaitė in Westminster. His best man was fellow actor Alan Rickman. Dexter's brothers were also actors; Graham Fletcher-Cook and Steve Fletcher. Fletcher is a dual British and Lithuanian citizen, having been granted Lithuanian citizenship in recognition of his work promoting Lithuanian cultural affairs.

Fletcher was appointed Officer of the Order of the British Empire (OBE) in the 2026 Birthday Honours for services to film and television.

== Filmography ==
=== Acting credits ===
Key
†	Denotes works that have not yet been released

Films
Year	Title	Role	Notes
1973	Steptoe and Son Ride Again	Small Boy	
1976	Bugsy Malone	Babyface	
1979	The Long Good Friday	The boy who asks for money to watch Harold's car	
1980	The Elephant Man	Bytes' Boy	
1984	The Bounty	Able Seaman Thomas Ellison	
1985	Revolution	Ned Dobb	
1986	Caravaggio	Young Caravaggio	
1987	Lionheart	Michael	
1988	Didn't You Kill My Brother?	Bike thief	
1988	The Raggedy Rawney	Tom	
1989	The Rachel Papers	Charles Highway	
1989	Twisted Obsession	Malcolm Greene	
1991	All Out	Angelo	
1993	Prince Cinders	Prince Cinders	
1996	Jude	Priest	
1997	The Man Who Knew Too Little	Otto	
1998	Lock, Stock and Two Smoking Barrels	Soap	
1999	Topsy-Turvy	Louis	
1999	Tube Tales	Joe	Segment: Mr Cool
2000	The Patriot	Cornwallis' tailor/valet	
2002	Below	Kingsley	
2003	Stander	Lee McCall	
2004	The Secret of Year Six	Mike	
2004	Layer Cake	Cody	
2005	Doom	Marcus "Pinky" Pinzerowski	
2006	Tristan & Isolde	Orick	
2007	Stardust	Skinny Pirate	
2008	Autumn	Michael	
2010	Kick-Ass	Cody	
2010	Amaya	Frenchman	
2010	Dead Cert	Eddie Christian	
2011	Jack Falls	Detective Edwards	
2011	Fedz	Hunter	
2011	The Three Musketeers	D'Artagnan's father	
2011	Wild Bill	Mysterious Barry	
2012	Coven	Mr. Sheers	
2012	St George's Day	Levi	
2014	Muppets Most Wanted		Cameo; deleted scenes
2014	Respectable: The Mary Millington Story	Narrator	
2016	Smoking Guns	Paul McVeigh	
2018	Terminal	Vince	
2018	Sherlock Gnomes	Reggie	Voice role
2023	Ghosted	Raoul	
2023	Love at First Sight	Val	

Television
Year	Title	Role	Notes
1976	Chimp Mates	Joey Graham	TV series
1978	Les Miserables	Gavroche	TV film
1989	The Bill	Tony Gillespie	Episode: "The Strong Survive"
1989-1993	Press Gang	James (Spike) Thomson	Main role; 43 episodes
1991	Murder Most Horrid	Colin	Season 1, Episode 5 "Murder at Tea Time"
1993–1994	GamesMaster	Presenter	Season 3
1997	The Famous Five	Lou	
1997	Solomon	Rehoboam	
2001	Band of Brothers	John Martin	
2003	The Deal	Charlie Whelan	TV film
2004	The Virgin Queen	Thomas Radclyffe, 3rd Earl of Sussex	
2006–2009	Hotel Babylon	Tony Casemore	32 episodes
2007	Robin Hood	Count Friedrich	1 episode
2008	New Tricks	Tommy Jackson	Episode: "Final Curtain"
2009	Misfits	Mike Young	
2011	White Van Man	Ian	
2013	Death in Paradise	Grant, The Cabin Barman	
2014	Rev.	Mike Tobin	Episode: 3.3
2014	Mount Pleasant	Gus	
2020	I Hate Suzie	Benjamin	

=== Filmmaking credits ===
Year	Title	Director	Executive producer	Writer	Notes
1999	Let the Good Times Roll	No	No	Yes	Short film
2010	Just for the Record	No	Yes	No	
2010	Dead Cert	No	Yes	No	
2011	Wild Bill	Yes	No	Yes	
2013	Sunshine on Leith	Yes	No	No	
2015	Eddie the Eagle	Yes	No	No	
2018	Bohemian Rhapsody	No	Yes	No	Replaced Bryan Singer as director for the final two weeks of filming; Received credit as executive producer in accordance with DGA rules
2019	Rocketman	Yes	No	No	
2022	The Offer	Yes	Yes	No	Directed 2 episodes
2023	Ghosted	Yes	No	No	

== Bibliography ==
- Holmstrom, John. The Moving Picture Boy: An International Encyclopaedia from 1895 to 1995. Norwich, Michael Russell, 1996, pp. 358–360.
