= Pibare Rama Rasam =

Song by Sadasiva Brahmendra

"Pibare Rama Rasam" is a classical song composed by Sadasiva Brahmendra. This song is usually rendered in raga Ahir Bhairav of Indian classical music.

== Translation ==
Drink (Verb - Piban) (implied as absorb) the essence (Rasam) of the name of Rama, o tongue (rasana).

It will help you (implied) remove or be distant (Dūrīkr̥ta) from association with sin (Pātaka) or be distant from those who cause you to sin and you will be fulfilled (Pūrita) with many kinds (Nānā Vidha) and types (varga) of rewards/gains (phala).

It is described as helping one be far removed (Vidūram) from the fear (Bhaya) and grief (Śōka) of the cycle of birth and death (Janana-Maraṇa), and as the essence (Sāraṃ) of all (Sakala) the religious treatises (Śāstra), the Vedas (Nigama) and sciences (Āgama).

It protects (Paripālita) all creation. Brahma was born of a lotus (Sarasija) from a golden egg (Garbha Aṇḍam - womb & egg) and then he created the whole universe. So this phrase implies that chanting Rama's name protects the whole universe. It will purify (Pavitrī) even the most (Parama) impious or heretic (Pāṣāṇḍam).

It is the pure (Śuddha) song (Gītam) that signature of the poet (Paramahamsa) has taken refuge in (Āśrama/Aśrita), it is the same which has been drunk (Pītam) by sages like Śuka Śaunaka and Kauśika.

== In film ==
The song was a hit in the Telugu movie, Padamati Sandhya Ragam.
