= GURPS Super Scum =

Tabletop role-playing sourcebook for GURPS

- Cover by Alan Gutierrez
- Designers: Mark Johnson
- Publishers: Steve Jackson Games
- Publication: 1989; 37 years ago
- Genres: Superhero
- Systems: GURPS

GURPS Super Scum is a sourcebook for GURPS.

== Contents ==
GURPS Super Scum is a book of "Supers" for GURPS Supers with an emphasis on villains. Each supervillain has a two-page write-up including a picture, complete game statistics, a history, abilities, and battle tactics.

GURPS Super Scum is a supplement for GURPS Supers of 30 supervillains, including a group of cat-types – "the Pride" – and their mansion.

== Publication history ==
GURPS Super Scum was written by Mark Johnson, with a cover by Alan Gutierrez and illustrations by Doug Shuler, and was published by Steve Jackson Games in 1989 as a 64-page book.

== Reception ==
Mike Jarvis reviewed GURPS Super Scum for Games International magazine, and gave it 3 stars out of 5, and stated that "While hardly being indispensable, this is certainly a useful book for GURPS Supers referees. We all know the feeling of trying to get a scenario ready at the last minute, and this book is a definite labour saving device for those times, or a springboard for ideas when you're short of a plot."

John Sullivan reviewed Super Scum in Space Gamer/Fantasy Gamer #88. Sullivan concludes in his review, "All in all, Super Scum is a useful book for the GURPS Supers player, but of little use to players of other supers systems; the villains could be converted, but it would probably be faster to design them from scratch."

== Reviews ==
Games Review vol 2 #3

== See also ==
- List of GURPS publications
