= André Stander =

South African police officer and bank robber

- Born: André Charles Stander; 22 November 1946; Transvaal, South Africa
- Died: 13 February 1984 (aged 37); Fort Lauderdale, Florida, U.S.
- Known for: Bank robberies
- Police career
- Branch: South African Police
- Department: Kempton Park CID
- Service years: 1963–1980
- Rank: Captain

André Charles Stander (22 November 1946 – 13 February 1984) was a South African criminal and policeman. One of the most infamous bank robbers in South Africa's history, Stander was notorious for the audacious manner with which he carried out his crimes; he sometimes carried out the crime on his lunch break, often returning to the scene as an investigating officer.

Stander was portrayed by American actor Thomas Jane in the 2003 film Stander.

== Police career ==
The son of a prominent figure in the South African Prison Service, Major General Francois Jacobus Stander (1916–2001), André was under pressure from an early age to pursue a career in law enforcement. He enrolled at the South African Police training college near Pretoria in 1963, graduating at the top of his class. Shortly afterwards he joined the Kempton Park criminal investigation department.

== Criminal activities ==
=== Robberies ===
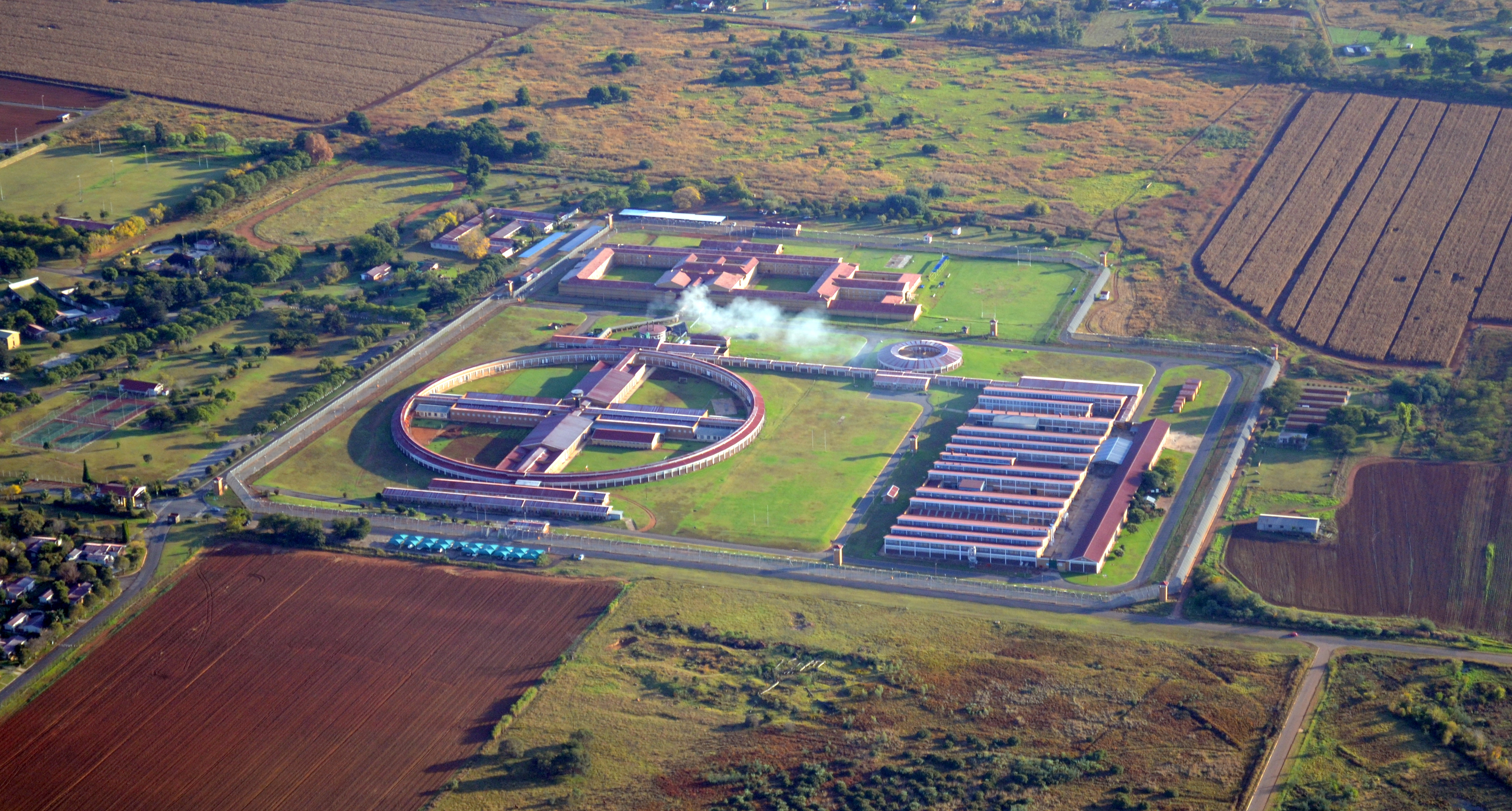
Zonderwater prison

In 1977, Stander flew to Durban and robbed his first bank. Between 1977 and 1980, he is believed to have stolen nearly a hundred thousand rand.

After robbing nearly 30 banks, Stander was arrested and sentenced to 75 years in prison on 6 May 1980. However, since many of the charges in the sentence ran concurrently, he faced an actual sentence of 17 years. Stander met Allan Heyl and Lee McCall at the Zonderwater maximum security prison.

=== Motivation ===
After his first trial, Stander claimed that his disillusionment with police service stemmed from a prior incident when he and his fellow officers shot and killed 176 unarmed schoolchildren during the 1976 Soweto uprising and massacre. However, Stander was not present with the police contingent at Thembisa when the shooting of unarmed schoolchildren took place.

Other accounts have suggested that Stander, who completed his national service in Angola during the South African Border War, may have also been bored with civilian life and craved the excitement afforded by a life of crime.

=== Stander Gang ===
On 11 August 1983, Stander and McCall, along with five other inmates, were taken from the prison's premises for a physiotherapy appointment. Once the prisoners were left alone with the physiotherapist, Stander and McCall overpowered her and escaped. The other prisoners refused to participate and stayed behind.

Stander and McCall returned to Zonderwater on 31 October 1983, in order to spring Allan Heyl from the facility where he was taking a trade test. From that day until the end of January 1984, the three began robbing banks together, under the nom de guerre of the Stander Gang – a term coined by the news media.

McCall was killed on 30 January 1984, in a police raid on the gang's hide-out in Houghton Estate. Heyl fled to Greece, then England, then Spain, and eventually back to England, where he was caught, tried, and sentenced to nine years in prison for robbery and a related firearms charge. After serving his time in the UK, he was extradited back to South Africa where he was sentenced to a further 33 years in prison. Heyl was released on parole on 18 May 2005.

While police were closing in on McCall in South Africa, Stander had been in Fort Lauderdale, Florida, trying to arrange for the sale of the gang's recently purchased sailing yacht—the Lilly Rose—that they planned to use for their final getaway once they had acquired enough money.

== Florida and death ==
While Stander remained in the United States, international arrest warrants and all points bulletins were issued for his arrest. Trying to make the best of the situation, Stander created the false identity of an Australian author named "Peter Harris" and forged a driver's license. Afterwards, he visited a used car lot and purchased a Ford Mustang from a dealer named Anthony Tomasello. On 10 February 1984, police pulled Stander over while he was driving and arrested him for driving an unregistered vehicle. Being relatively unknown to the American authorities at that time, Stander presented his false ID to the police, who recognized it as a forgery and subsequently seized it—adding driver's license forgery to his list of offenses—but believed his story about his identity and released him.

Once released on the same evening, Stander returned to the police impound lot where his seized Mustang was being kept, broke in and stole the car. On the following morning, Stander returned to the same used car lot where he had purchased the vehicle and asked the same dealer, Tomasello, to have the car re-painted in a different colour. However, Tomasello had just read about the Stander Gang in a local newspaper. He told Stander that he would help him, got his information, and as soon as Stander had left, Tomasello called his lawyer. On his lawyer's advice, Tomasello called the local police.

Based on Tomasello's information, a police tactical unit surrounded the apartment that Stander had been using as a hideout, but Stander was not there. He had acquired a bicycle to use while his car was with Tomasello to be repainted. He had left the apartment on the bicycle and returned only after the police had surrounded it. As he unknowingly rode up to the apartment complex, officer Michael van Stetina—who had been posted on the perimeter—recognised Stander and attempted to stop him.

Stander tried to get away, but as Stetina prevented his escape a struggle for the officer's shotgun began. The gun discharged and Stander was hit; he fell onto the apartment complex's driveway, bleeding profusely. Stetina immediately radioed for an ambulance. Although officer Stetina tried to administer first aid, Stander's wounds were too extensive and he bled to death before an ambulance arrived.
