= Thomas Jane =

American actor (born 1969)

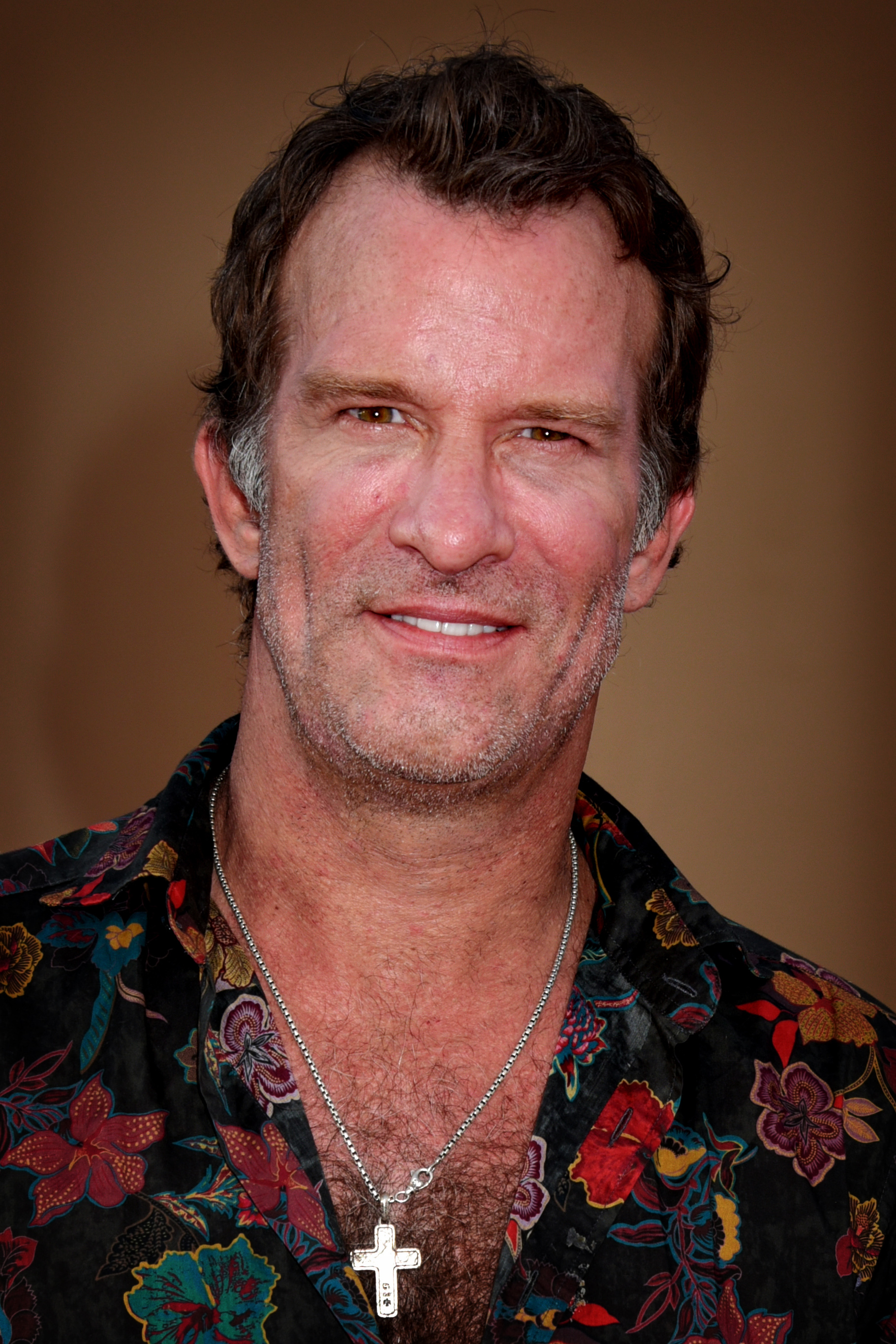
- Jane in 2019
- Born: Thomas Elliott III; February 22, 1969 (age 57); Baltimore, Maryland, U.S.
- Other names: Thomas Bridgett; Tom Janes; Tom Elliott; Tom Jane
- Occupations: Actor; producer; director; comic book writer
- Years active: 1987–present
- Spouses: Aysha Hauer (m. 1989; div. 1995) Patricia Arquette (m. 2006; div. 2011)
- Children: 2

Thomas Jane (born Thomas Elliott III; February 22, 1969) is an American actor. He is known for appearing in the films Boogie Nights (1997), Deep Blue Sea (1999), The Sweetest Thing (2002), The Punisher (2004), The Mist (2007), 1922 (2017), and The Predator (2018). Jane's television roles include Mickey Mantle in the television film 61* (2001), Ray Drecker in the HBO series Hung (2009–2011), for which he was nominated for three Golden Globe Awards, and Josephus Miller in the Syfy/Amazon Video series The Expanse (2015–2019).

Outside his acting career, he has edited and written various comic books, the first of which was Bad Planet (2005). He made his directorial debut with the crime thriller Dark Country (2009). He has also modelled for various magazines, including Men's Health and Da Man. Jane will portray Dr. Leonard 'Bones' McCoy in the 5th season of Star Trek: Strange New Worlds.

== Early life and education ==
Jane was born Thomas Elliott III on February 22, 1969, in Baltimore, Maryland, the son of Cynthia (née Jane), an antiques dealer, and Thomas Elliott Jr., a genetic engineer. He later changed his surname to his mother's maiden name, as there was already a member of the Screen Actors Guild with his birth name.

He attended Thomas Sprigg Wootton High School but dropped out and started taking acting classes while working at a hardware store. He later moved to Hollywood to pursue an acting career. He was initially homeless and lived out of his car, often doing street performances to earn money: "I had two songs in my repertoire that I hammered to death, 'Hey Joe' and 'Knockin' on Heaven's Door'. People used to pelt me with change just to shut me up."

Jane is an alumnus of the Lee Strasberg Theatre and Film Institute.

== Career ==
Jane began his acting career in 1986 at age 17 after his acting coach suggested he audition for the lead male role opposite Vijayashanti in the Indian romantic comedy Padamati Sandhya Ragam (1987), which was being filmed in the Washington metropolitan area. As a result, he spent eight months filming including six months in India. The production ran out of money to pay him, so the actor was given an RV used in the film which he sold to finance his move to Hollywood.

After arriving in Hollywood, Jane's early roles included Zeph in Buffy the Vampire Slayer (1992), directed by Fran Rubel Kuzui, and the film Nemesis (1992). He also had supporting roles in several high-profile films, including The Crow: City of Angels (1996), Face/Off (1997), Boogie Nights (1997), The Thin Red Line (1998), Thursday (1998), and Magnolia (1999). After starring in the science fiction horror film Deep Blue Sea (1999), and receiving critical acclaim as baseball player Mickey Mantle in 61* (2001), Jane received offers for leading roles beginning with Andre Stander in the South African film Stander (2003), for which he gained further critical acclaim.

Along with director Jonathan Hensleigh and Avi Arad, Jane has said he was the first and only actor to be asked to play the title role in the film The Punisher (2004). He turned down the role twice, as he did not have much interest in the superhero genre. When they asked him the second time to play the Punisher, Tim Bradstreet's artwork of the character secured his interest. After finding out that the character was not a traditional superhero, but more of an antihero and a vigilante crime fighter, he accepted, became a fan, then trained for several months with Navy SEALs, gaining more than 25 pounds (11 kg) of muscle. Later, in 2025, Jane declared: "I was miscast as Frank Castle. He's an Italian. He's got black hair and a whole different sort of lineage… I'm not that guy. I had to dye my hair black and become a different guy. I'm happy the part is now played by someone who is more right for that role. I had fun, and I did the best I could with it. I'm very grateful for it, but I'm not that guy."

In addition to starring in the film, he contributed his voice to the video games The Punisher and Gun (both 2005). He also co-owns RAW, an entertainment company which he runs with Steve Niles and Tim Bradstreet. RAW Studios, the company's comic-book division, released Bad Planet (written by Jane) through Image Comics. Jane became a spokesperson for Niles and the cover model for comic-book character Cal McDonald in 2006. In addition to his screen work, Jane has appeared several times on stage, and received strong critical reviews as Tom in Tennessee Williams' The Glass Menagerie, and as Chris in Arthur Miller's All My Sons. He has also portrayed a fictionalized version of himself in an episode of the television series Arrested Development.

Jane did not return in the planned sequel to The Punisher. Lions Gate Entertainment had approved a direct sequel due to the strong sales of the film on DVD. However, the project lingered in development for over three years. Jonathan Hensleigh completed a first draft of the script before leaving the project in 2006. John Dahl was in talks to direct the film, but cited his dislike of the script and the reduced budget as his reasons for refusing. In a statement on May 15, 2007, and in two audio interviews, Jane said that he pulled out of the project due to creative differences and the studio's further reduction of the budget.

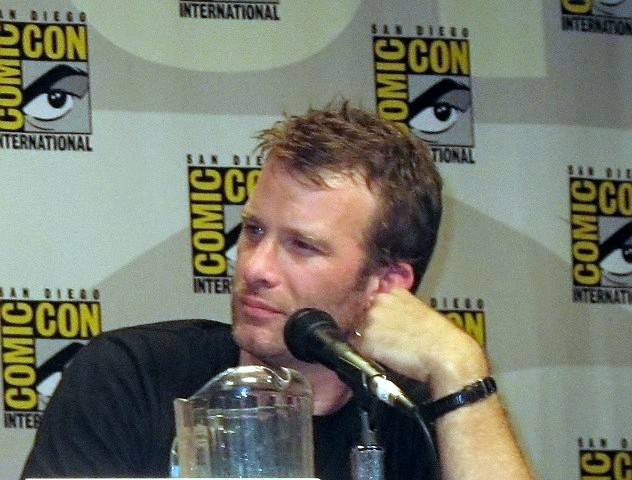
Jane at the 2007 San Diego Comic-Con

Jane said in June 2007 that Zack Snyder had expressed interest in casting him for the role of the Comedian for the adaptation of Alan Moore's graphic novel Watchmen (1986–1987), but because he was too busy, he turned down the role, which was eventually given to Jeffrey Dean Morgan. The same year he starred in Frank Darabont's adaptation of the Stephen King novella, The Mist. His directorial debut was the 2009 film Dark Country, in which he also played the main character. In 2009, Jane starred with Ving Rhames in the crime film Give 'Em Hell, Malone, which premiered at San Diego Comic-Con.

On December 18, 2008, HBO announced it was picking up the black comedy Hung, and Jane was contracted to star in the show. He plays the character of Ray Drecker, a high-school history teacher and basketball coach, who after attending a self-help class while being down on his luck, decides to market the large size of his penis as a path to success. The series was renewed for a second season, which aired in the summer of 2010. The show was renewed for a final season, which aired in fall of 2011.

Jane appeared on the June/July 2010 cover of Men's Fitness magazine. He voiced the character Jonah Hex in an animated short as a companion piece on the Special Edition Blu-ray and two-disc Special Edition DVD release of Batman: Under the Red Hood.

On June 7, 2012, Jane released a digital EP, Don't Come Home, under the pseudonym Rusty Blades. At the 2012 San Diego Comic-Con, Jane debuted an independently financed Punisher short film, Dirty Laundry, directed by Phil Joanou and co-starring Ron Perlman.

Jane portrayed one of the lead roles in the critically acclaimed The Expanse, playing detective Joe Miller for four of the show's six seasons.

Jane co-starred in Shane Black's The Predator (2018), a direct sequel to the 1987 film Predator and the 1990 film Predator 2.

Jane plays a lead role in the Australian crime drama series Troppo, the first season of which aired in 2022 and the second in 2024.

In August 2024, actor Jon Bernthal revealed that he trained with Thomas Jane to prepare for his role in the Disney+ series Daredevil: Born Again. The collaboration, which brought together two actors known for portraying the Punisher, highlights Jane's continued influence in the action genre.

In December 2025, it was announced that Jane will portray Dr. Leonard 'Bones' McCoy in the 5th season of Star Trek: Strange New Worlds.

== Personal life ==
In 1989, Jane married actress Aysha Hauer, daughter of Dutch actor Rutger Hauer. They divorced in 1995.

After meeting through mutual friends in 2001, Jane and actress Patricia Arquette became engaged in 2002 and had a daughter together before marrying on June 25, 2006, at the Palazzo Contarini del Bovolo in Venice, Italy. In January 2009, Arquette filed for divorce from Jane on the grounds of irreconcilable differences, but the couple reconciled and Arquette sought to abandon the divorce petition six months later. However, they proceeded with the divorce, which was finalized on July 1, 2011. The pair were granted joint custody of their child.

Jane and former Hung co-star Anne Heche announced that they were in a relationship in 2019; however, they had separated by the time of Heche's death in 2022.

For the vigilante action film The Punisher (2004), Jane underwent intense military-style preparation, learning multiple martial arts and military psychology, including studying the ways of the samurai. During filming, he stood at a height of 5 feet 10 inches (1.78 m) and weight of 175 pounds (79 kg), having bulked up by 21 pounds (9.5 kg).

Jane is known for his preference for going barefoot, including at film premieres and while on set.

He is a comic book fan and, besides participating in numerous conventions and fan meetups, he also writes, edits, and publishes his own comic titles, such as Bad Planet and others.

== Filmography ==
Key
†	Denotes films that have not yet been released

=== Film ===
Year	Title	Role	Notes	Ref.
1987	Padamati Sandhya Ragam	Chris	Debut film	
1992	Buffy the Vampire Slayer	Zeph	Credited as Tom Janes	
1993	Nemesis	Billy		
1994	At Ground Zero	Thomas Quinton Pennington	Credited as Tom Elliott	
1996	The Crow: City of Angels	"Nemo"		
1997	The Last Time I Committed Suicide	Neal Cassady		
1997	Face/Off	Burke Hicks		
1997	Boogie Nights	Todd Parker		
1998	Thursday	Casey Wells		
1998	The Velocity of Gary	Gary		
1998	Zack and Reba	Sparky Stokes		
1998	The Thin Red Line	Private Homer Ash		
1999	Deep Blue Sea	Carter Blake		
1999	Molly	Sam		
1999	Junked	Switch		
1999	Magnolia	Young Jimmy Gator	Cameo appearance	
2000	Under Suspicion	Detective Felix Owens		
2001	Original Sin	Bill • Walter Downs • Mephisto		
2001	Eden	Dov		
2002	The Sweetest Thing	Peter Donahue		
2003	Dreamcatcher	Henry Devlin		
2003	Stander	Andre Stander		
2004	The Punisher	Frank Castle • The Punisher	Credited as Tom Jane	
2006	The Tripper	Buzz Hall	Also executive producer	
2007	The Mist	David Drayton		
2008	The Butler's in Love	The Butler	Short film	
2008	Mutant Chronicles	Sergeant Mitch Hunter	Direct–to–VOD film	
2008	Killshot	Wayne Colson		
2009	Give 'Em Hell, Malone	Malone	Direct–to–DVD film	
2009	Dark Country	Dick • Bloodyface	Direct–to–DVD film; also director and producer	
2010	DC Showcase: Jonah Hex	Jonah Hex	Voice role; short film	
2010	Scott Pilgrim vs. the World	Vegan Police Officer	Uncredited cameo appearance	
2011	I Melt with You	Richard	Also executive producer	
2012	LOL	Allen Williams		
2012	The Punisher: Dirty Laundry	Frank Castle • The Punisher	Short film; also producer	
2013	Sirius	Narrator	Documentary film	
2013	Pawn Shop Chronicles	The Man	Direct–to–VOD film	
2013	Buttwhistle	Grumisch	Direct–to–VOD film	
2014	White Bird in a Blizzard	Detective Scieziesciez		
2014	Drive Hard	Peter Roberts	Direct–to–VOD film	
2014	Heavenly Sword	Loki	Voice role; direct–to–VOD film	
2014	Reach Me	"Wolfie"		
2015	Vice	Roy	Direct–to–VOD film	
2015	Into the Grizzly Maze	Beckett Moore	Direct–to–VOD film	
2015	Broken Horses	Gabriel Heckum		
2016	Standoff	Carter Greene	Direct–to–VOD film; also executive producer	
2016	The Veil	Jim Jacobs	Direct–to–VOD film	
2016	Before I Wake	Mark Hobson		
2016	USS Indianapolis: Men of Courage	Lieutenant Adrian Marks		
2016	The World's Biggest Asshole	Coleman F. Sweeney	Short film	
2017	Hot Summer Nights	Sergeant Frank Calhoun		
2017	1922	Wilfred "Wilf" Leland James		
2018	A.X.L.	Chuck Hill		
2018	The Predator	Baxley		
2019	Crown Vic	Ray Mandel		
2020	The Vanished	Paul Michaelson	Direct–to–VOD film	
2020	Hunter's Moon	The Sheriff	Direct–to–VOD film	
2020	Money Plane	Harry Greer	Direct–to–VOD film	
2020	Run Hide Fight	Todd Hull		
2020	Breach	Admiral Kiernan Adams	Direct–to–VOD film	
2021	The Last Son	Solomon	Also executive producer	
2021	Apache Junction	Al Longfellow	Direct–to–VOD film	
2021	Warning	David		
2022	Vendetta	Dante	Direct–to–VOD film	
2022	Murder at Yellowstone City	Thaddeus Murphy	Direct–to–VOD film; also executive producer	
2022	Dig	Scott Brennan	Direct–to–VOD film; also executive producer	
2022	Slayers	Elliot Jones	Direct–to–VOD film; also executive producer	
2023	Bad Hombres	Rob Carlton		
2023	One Ranger	Alex Tyree	Direct–to–VOD film; also executive producer	
2024	Bosco	Hunt	Also executive producer	
2025	Play Dirty	Philly Webb		
2025	Salvation	Whitney		
2025	Frontier Crucible	Charlie "Mule" McKee	Also executive producer	

=== Television ===
Year	Title	Role	Notes	Ref.
1990–1991	She-Wolf of London	Johnny	Episode: "Heart Attack"; credited as Thomas Bridgett	
1995	High Tide	Barry	Episode: "Barry"	
1997	Hollywood Confidential	Lee	Television film	
1999	Jonni Nitro	Brack	Also director (Short web animation series)	
2001	61*	Mickey Mantle	Television film	
2004	Arrested Development	Himself	Episode: "The One Where They Build a House"	
2006	Medium	Clay Bicks	Episodes: "Four Dreams: Parts 1 & 2"	
2009–2011	Hung	Ray Drecker	Lead role; 30 episodes	
2015	Texas Rising	James Wykoff	Episodes: "Fate and Fury" & "Blood for Blood"	
2015–2019	The Expanse	Joe Miller • The Investigator	Main role (seasons 1–2), Special appearances (seasons 3–4); 24 episodes (also directed episode: "Mother")	
2019	Robot Chicken	The Punisher (voice)	Episode: "Spike Fraser in: Should I Happen to Back Into a Horse"	
2022–2024	Troppo	Ted Conkaffey	Lead role; 16 episodes (also executive producer & directed 2 episodes)	
TBA	Star Trek: Strange New Worlds †	Dr. Leonard "Bones" McCoy	Post-production (season 5)	

=== Video games ===
Year	Title	Voice role	Ref.
2005	The Punisher	Frank Castle / The Punisher	
2005	Gun	Colton White	

== Discography ==
=== Albums ===
Year	Artist	Album	Notes
2012	Rusty Blades	Don't Come Home	Singer-songwriter; Guitarist

== Bibliography ==
Year	Title	Issues	Notes	Ref.
2005–2013	Bad Planet	8	Editor and written with Steve Niles (1–6) and Bruce Jones (7–8)	
2007	Alien Pig Farm 3000	4	Written with Steve Niles and Todd Farmer	
2012	Dark Country	Graphic novel	Editor	
2025	The Lycan	6	Editor and written with David James Kelly and Mike Carey	

== See also ==
- List of barefooters
