= GURPS Vampire: The Masquerade =

Role-playing game adaptation

- Cover art by Mark Pace
- Illustrators: Tim Bradstreet, John Cobb, Felipe Echevarria, Laura Eisenhour, D. Alexander Gregory, Larry MacDougall, Robert MacNeil, Ken Meyer Jr., Mark Pace, Dan Smith, Richard Thomas, Joshua Gabriel Timbrook
- Writers: Jeff Koke; Chris W. McCubbin
- Publishers: Steve Jackson Games
- Publication: 1993
- Genres: Tabletop role-playing game
- Systems: GURPS
- Series: World of Darkness
- ISBN: 1-55634-275-6

GURPS Vampire: The Masquerade is a licensed adaptation of White Wolf Publishing's horror role-playing game Vampire: The Masquerade. It was written by Jeff Koke, and published by Steve Jackson Games in 1993 for the third edition of their GURPS (Generic Universal Role-Playing System) rules.

== Contents ==
The purpose of this book is to explain how to play the Vampire: The Masquerade role-playing game first created by Mark Rein-Hagen using the 3rd-edition GURPS rules system. The book is divided into an introduction consisting of a series of letters and diaries that talk about the existence of vampires. Chapters 1–7 cover the following material:

1. . "A World of Darkness": Vampires in the modern world: Their clans, their rules and laws that keep their existence a secret from humanity, and their social conventions.
2. . "Characters": How to create characters.
3. . "Permutations": Other rules about the vampire characters
4. . "Disciplines": Vampires' special powers.
5. . "Clans": The seven main clans, and "beggars" — vampires that do not belong to a clan.
6. . "Campaigns": suggestions for creating scenarios and campaigns. Because this is a GURPS rule set, suggestions for how other GURPS genres could interface with this one are given.
7. . "Conversions": How to convert from the White Wolf game system to GURPS.

The book ends with a glossary of game terms and vampire slang.

== Publication history ==
White Wolf Publishing released the original Vampire: The Masquerade game in 1991, followed by other books set in the World of Darkness line. Two years later, White Wolf licensed Steve Jackson Games (SJG) to revise the World of Darkness books for SJG's GURPS rules system. The first book published by SJG was GURPS Vampire: The Masquerade (1993), a 192-page softcover book written by Jeff Koke, with additional material by Chris W. McCubbin, interior artwork by Tim Bradstreet, John Cobb, Felipe Echevarria, Laura Eisenhour, D. Alexander Gregory, Larry MacDougall, Robert MacNeil, Ken Meyer Jr., Dan Smith, Richard Thomas, and Joshua Gabriel Timbrook, and cover art by Mark Pace. The book proved to be enormously popular and went through three printings. A German translation was published by Pegasus Spiele in 1996.

In the 2014 book Designers & Dragons: The '80s, game historian Shannon Appelcline stated that "GURPS again proved itself 'universal' in the early '90s when SJG started adapting other game worlds to the system. GURPS Bunnies & Burrows (1992), based on an old FGU game, was the first. The GURPS versions of White Wolf's very popular World of Darkness games were a much bigger coup. The first release, GURPS Vampire (1993), rapidly went through three printings."

== Reception ==
In the May 1994 edition of Dragon (Issue #205), Rick Swan called the White Wolf/SJG product "a great idea... the most successful hybrid in role-playing history." Swan admired the "slick pages and crisp graphics", noting that "GURPS Vampire is the handsomest volume in the GURPS line and makes the White Wolf version seem lackluster... The illustrations are among the best I've ever seen in an RPG product." He noted that "Lucid writing, never White Wolf's strong suit but a hallmark of the GURPS line, makes the tricky mechanics easy to digest." Comparing the SJG version to the original White Wolf product, Swan thought that which version was better depended on the player's background. "If you’re familiar with other Storyteller products... stick with White Wolf; the GURPS book doesn’t add enough material to justify learning a new set of rules. If you’re a GURPS player, go for the GURPS version; it’s better written and easier to understand. If you’re not familiar with either rules set, it’s a tough call. I lean toward the GURPS book, even though you’ll also have to invest in the GURPS Basic Set." Swan concluded by giving this book an above average rating of 5 out of 6, saying, "Not only has GURPS withstood the test of time, it opens the door to a library of possibilities. Aren’t you curious how GURPS: Vampire interfaces with GURPS Old West?"

Cullen Bunn reviewed GURPS Vampire: The Masquerade in White Wolf #46 (Aug., 1994), rating it a 5 out of 5 and stated that "Imagine vampires in the old west, Victorian England or the far future. Those who want to play in the traditional Gothic-Punk world, however, can find everything they need in this one book."

== Awards ==
In 1994, GURPS Vampire: The Masquerade won the Origins Award for "Best Roleplaying Supplement of 1993".

== Other reviews ==
- The Last Province No. 5 (Aug/Sept 1993, "Pandora's Box")
- Windgeflüster No. 34 (Oct 1996, "Rezensionen", in German)
- Backstab No. 1 (Jan/Feb 1997, in French)
- Dosdediez (Número 1 – Nov/Dic 1993)
- Casus Belli No. 77
- Casus Belli No. 101
