= GURPS Black Ops =

1997 supplement for the GURPS role-playing game

Find the truth - and kill it
- Designers: Jeff Koke; S. John Ross
- Publishers: Steve Jackson Games
- Publication: 1997; 29 years ago
- Genres: Modern-day conspiracy
- Systems: GURPS

GURPS Black Ops is an modern-day conspiracy sourcebook for the GURPS (Generic Universal Role-Playing System), written by Jeff Koke, and S. John Ross, and published by Steve Jackson Games in 1997.

== Contents ==
GURPS Black Ops is a setting that has our planet under threat from various alien, supernatural, and other monstrous powers. The clandestine agency (not bound to any one country) that protects the world (who, generally, is blissfully ignorant) from these threats is simply called the "Company". It is usually able to recruit the finest from every profession deemed useful to it, from combat agents to scientists to intelligence personnel.

The setting usually has players in the dangerous job of agents working for the company, or in the even more perilous profession of opposing the agency for whatever reason.

The setting relies heavily on use of various known or less known urban legends and conspiracy theories.

=== The Black Ops ===
In GURPS Black Ops, the player characters are super-skilled agents known as "Black Operatives", or "Black Ops". Individuals having undergone incredibly intense levels of training prior to their graduation, the black ops can be likened to the starring roles of classic action movies.

The basic skills of every black op include hand-to-hand combat, the use of most small arms, the operation of many forms of modern electronics, basic sciences and espionage and infiltration skills. Beyond this basic expertise, however, each black op belongs to a department which encourages a specialized focus in a certain set of skills.

=== The Company ===
The agency which trains and employs the Black Ops is known to its members as the company. The company is divided into five departments: Combat, Intelligence, Science, Technology and Security. Every Op belongs to one department and follows that department's directives at all times, even (especially) while on missions working with other departments. As each department has goals which occasionally clashes with the goals of other departments, this often causes friction and competition between the departments. The departments' heads answer only to Argus, who actually encourage inter-department competition as a means for them to "keep their edge".

Combat: the first department ever created for the black ops, Combat's mission is to locate and destroy the enemy at all costs. Its Ops, called "Grunts" by the others, are nearly all experts in hand-to-hand combat, beyond that of other Ops, as well as in the use of multiple weapons and explosives. Combat Ops are characterized as intelligent and refined, and are also characterized as appreciative of fine art and literature in equal respect as to weapons.

Intelligence: this department's function involves information gathering and analysis through any means. While every black op is skilled in the art of espionage, Intelligence Ops are the best at what they do, masters of disguise and experts in the art of infiltration. Called "Spooks" by the other departments, Intelligence Ops are respected for their skill, but also known to be overly methodical in their planning.

Science: the scientists of the company, the purpose of the Science Department is to acquire information on the company's foes, and to put it to good use. Its members are experts in multiple sciences, from biology and psychology to applied physics. They also provide the department with its doctors and medical specialists. Its members are derisively called "Geeks" by the rest of the company, especially by the Combat Department, with which Science has frequent arguments based on Combat Ops' tendency to blow up the things Science would like to bring home to experiment on.

Security: both the least-appreciated and the hardest-working department, Security is charged with protecting the lives of the black ops while maintaining the conspiracy of silence that the company works under. The Security ops have the broadest training, allowing them to fairly judge the safety of any mission at any point in the operation. They also have the authority to restrict the conduct of any operative on a squad, regardless of which department sponsored the mission, at any time, for any reason (or for no reason). Rarely is this authority used, and if it is, it is almost never questioned by the directors of the departments (though often loudly questioned by other squad members). Security Ops, called "Secops" by other departments, are also more negatively called "Squealers". The other departments consider them a necessary pain, with a tendency towards overprotective behavior

Technology: created to develop, refine and implement improvements in the general technology level of the company, they create advanced devices for all of the other departments. This technology is almost constantly experimental and insufficiently tested, as the Technology ops' constant push towards new advancements mean that by the time a device is out of beta testing, another techie has invented something more advanced to replace it. The Technology ops are almost always called "techies" or "hackers", and have a reputation of being both geniuses and disaster-prone, due to their habit of tinkering with devices in the field, sometimes with mixed results.

== Reviews ==
GURPS Black Ops was reviewed in The Unspeakable Oath #16/17.

- Backstab #8
- InQuest #33
- Casus Belli #111

== See also ==
- List of GURPS publications
