= Padamati Sandhya Ragam =

- Theatrical release poster
- Directed by: Jandhyala
- Written by: Jandhyala
- Produced by: Gummaluri Sastry; Meer Abdulla
- Starring: Vijayashanti; Thomas Jane; Sivamani
- Cinematography: P. Diwakar
- Edited by: Gautam Raju
- Music by: S. P. Balasubrahmanyam
- Production company: Pravasandhra Chitra
- Release date: 11 April 1987
- Running time: 142 minutes
- Countries: India; United States
- Language: Telugu
- Budget: ₹25 lakh (US$200,000)

Padamati Sandhya Ragam (Note: Also romanised as Padamati Sandhyaa Raagam or Padamati Sandhyaragam.) (Telugu: Paḍamaṭi Sandhyārāgaṁ; transl. Evening raga of the West) (Note: Certain words of the title are ambiguous; Sandhya can refer to either the film's character or twilight, while ragam can either mean colourful or the musical concept. More specifically, the title is also a phrase that literally means "the colour of the setting sun in the west" that is used poetically to refer to the golden hour before dusk. However, Evening Raga of the West is the most commonly used translation.) is a 1987 Telugu-language drama film written and directed by Jandhyala. The film features Vijayashanti as Sandhya, a young Indian woman, and Thomas Jane in his film debut as Chris, a White American man, who fall in love after Sandhya's family immigrates to the United States.

The film was produced by Indian Americans Gummaluri Sastry and Meer Abdulla, who initiated the project after meeting Jandhyala and musician S. P. Balasubrahmanyam. Padamati Sandhya Ragam was conceived as an American-Indian co-production, featuring a cast and crew from both countries. The music, composed by S. P. Balasubrahmanyam, includes lyrics by Sadasiva Brahmendra, Annamacharya, and Veturi. Despite its modest budget, the film was shot across various locations in the United States, with additional scenes filmed in India.

Upon release, Padamati Sandhya Ragam was well received by Indian audiences and won the Filmfare Award for Best Telugu Film, as well as the Nandi Award for Best Story Writer for Jandhyala. The film has gained retrospective recognition for its portrayal of the Indian diaspora.

== Plot ==
Sandhya arrives in India with her husband Chris to visit their family after her father's death. They are received coldly at the airport by his daughter Anitha, who escorts them to her father's home. As he had no sons, the family is afraid that Chris, a white American, won't be able to conduct the traditional last rites as the deceased's closest male relative, but he insists on taking the responsibility and cremates his father-in-law's body as the sun sets. After coming back that night, he tries to talk to Anitha but she scolds him instead, blaming him for disrupting her grandfather's peace. Sandhya intervenes by slapping her and reveals that Anitha is actually their daughter who was taken away by her grandfather when she was five years old. Sandhya then narrates what happened beforehand.

20 years earlier, Sandhya arrives with her family in the United States after her father finds a job there with the help of his younger brother Rama Rao who is already living in the US. Sandhya's father Adinarayana, a staunch traditionalist, is confused by American culture and sticks to his traditions despite Rama Rao's attempts to make him assimilate and everyone else's bemusement. They also meet Seshagiri Rao, an ice cream shop owner who is also Indian, and his son Ganapathi, a gourmand. One day, Ganapathi takes Sandhya to the supermarket but abandons her after hearing of a new ice cream shop, causing her to panic. After nearly getting run over by his car, Sandhya meets Chris. Because of the language barrier, he decides to take her to an Indian family he knows and they end up arriving at Seshagiri Rao's house, where they learn they are neighbours.

Later, she meets her other neighbour Ronald, a black drummer. They both get closer to her, to Adinarayana's disapproval. As they fall in love with Sandhya, they get Ganapathi to teach them Telugu, but humorously mangle the language on their first attempts. Both of them quickly improve and end up proposing to her on the same day. After thinking about it, she comes outside the next day with a white sari, signalling her acceptance of Chris to his celebration and Ronald's frustration.

Adinarayana tries to arrange her marriage with an Indian doctor named Ravi. Ravi is progressive, however, and encourages her to continue pursuing Chris. Later, Chris and Sandhya secretly meet up and he proposes they elope, to which Sandhya reluctantly agrees. Adinarayana learns about their love and tries to catch them with Ronald's help, so they run away on a motorcycle and then steal an RV when that stops working. After losing them, the couple realise they have no money and manage to satiate their hunger with some milk found in the RV's fridge. Escaping a close call with the police the next morning, they luckily find other Indians who let them stay in their house. Adinarayana consents to their marriage, but the couple gets into an argument on whose customs to follow. After Ronald spots them and tells Rama Rao, he goes to them and ends up resolving the matter by suggesting holding two ceremonies – one at a church and another at a temple. Thus, Chris and Sandhya finally get married.

In the present, Sandhya gives a message on how all humans are equal, proceeded by Chris talking about his appreciation of Indian culture. They then offer Anitha the opportunity to go to America and live with them. As Chris and Sandhya leave for the airport the day after, Anitha wistfully sits in her room with the door closed. Right before they depart, she shows up, asks Chris to forgive her, and joins them on the flight.

== Cast ==
- Vijayashanti as Sandhya (dubbed by Saritha)
- Tom Jane as Chris
  - Benjiman York as Young Chris
- Sivamani as Ronald
- Gummaluri Sastry as Adinarayana (dubbed by Suthi Veerabhadra Rao)
- Meer Abdulla as Rama Rao (dubbed by Jandhyala)
- Seshagiri Rao as Seshagiri Rao (dubbed by Potti Prasad)
- Vijay as Ganapathi (dubbed by Subhalekha Sudhakar)
- Ashajyothy as Sudha (dubbed by Dubbing Janaki)
- Sudheshna Reddy as Rama Rao's wife
- Suthi Velu as Natanalayam Manager
- Sudha as Lakshmi
- Ravi Chitturi as Ravi

Additional cast: Johnson, Godman, Elizabeth, Bindu, Jyothy, Baby Rohini, Vijay Kothari, Bhushan Rao, Rama Sastry, Seetha Sastry, Mrunalini.

== Production ==
=== Development ===
My acting coach, Ralph Tabakin, called me up and said, "There's these Indians in town, and they’re looking for a blond-haired, blue-eyed kid to be in their Indian Bollywood movie." And I said, "Ralph, I don't have blue eyes. I can't go." Ralph said, "Well, you got blue eyes now. You go down there and get the part. And I get 10 percent, ’cause I’m acting as your agent in this regard." And I did, and I did. And he did. [Laughs.]

— Thomas Jane in 2011, reminiscing about his casting in the film

Meer Abdulla came to the United States as an international student and aspired to be a filmmaker. He met Gummuluri Sastry, an engineer already living in the US and they started working together in theatre with Sastry directing the plays and Abdulla playing the lead role. As the leader of a Telugu association, Sastry had the opportunity to invite the crew of the Telugu films Sankarabharanam (1980) and Ananda Bhairavi (1983) to tour US. This ended up giving Sastry and Abdulla the chance to meet Jandhyala and S. P. Balasubrahmanyam, leading to the idea of the film being conceived and developed. After a variety of other names were suggested for the film, Balasubrahmanyam's suggestion Padamati Sandhya Ragam received approval from everyone and became the final title. Jandhyala gave US$116 to Balasubrahmanyam as a token of gratitude.

=== Casting ===
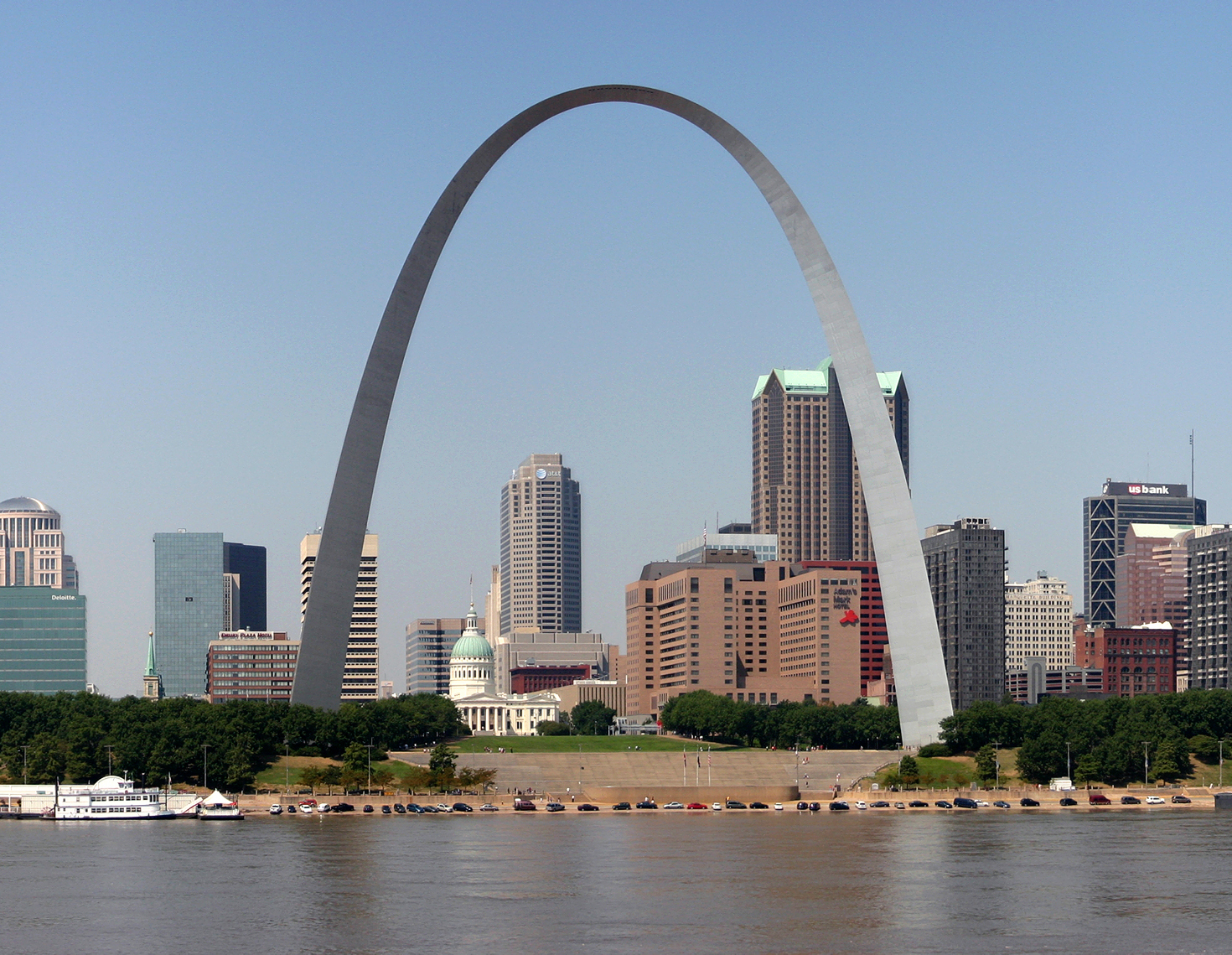
The Gateway Arch where the song "Ee Toorupu Aa Paschimam" was shot

Balasubrahmanyam also proposed that Sivamani play Ronald. Finding an actor for Chris' role proved difficult. Instead of using an established actor, a long campaign involving multiple talent agents was initiated. However, the initial actor chosen dropped out under uncertain circumstances, with Abdulla claiming that he had left after getting a last-minute offer from Hollywood in 2006 but then stating that he did not know the reason in 2010. Thomas Jane, 17 years old at the time, was an acting student in Maryland and was persuaded by his acting coach to take up the role. He was the final choice for the role and Padamati Sandhya Ragam was his film debut. Because the production ran out of money to pay him, he was given the RV that was used to make the film.

=== Filming ===
Principal Photography for the film commenced on 3 August 1986. The American portion was filmed first, with most of the scenes being shot in the residences and shops of Sastry's and Abdulla's friends and neighbours in the Washington metropolitan area. The song "Muddugare Yasoda" was shot in Missouri Botanical Garden, St. Louis, Missouri, and New Vrindaban temple, West Virginia. The song "Ee Toorupu Aa Paschimam" was shot at Gateway Arch, Sri Venkateswara Temple, Pittsburgh and Washington Memorial Park. Filming lasted two months.

== Reception and analysis ==
The Washington Post stated the film "attracted rave reviews in India" in a 1989 article. In retrospect, it has been identified as one of a number of films made by Telugu Americans in the 1980s that explored life in the country. Jahnavi Reddy of The News Minute analysed Padamati Sandhya Ragam as being a precursor to later Indian films about international romance released after the country's liberalisation and wave of mass migration to the United States. She also stated that the casting of Sivamani, an Indian musician, as the black American character Ronald in the film was "problematic" and discussed how he was mostly played off as comic relief compared to Chris, pondering if he would have been accepted by Sandhya's family if she fell in love with him instead.

== Soundtrack ==
S. P. Balasubrahmanyam composed the music of the film. One song from the film, "Life is Shabby", gained renewed attention in the late 2010s due to its odd English lyrics and use of rap, which is significantly different from Balasubrahmanyam's usual style.

No.	Title	Lyrics	Singer(s)	Length
1.	"Ee Toorupu Aa Paschimam"	Veturi	S. P. Balasubrahmanyam and S. Janaki
2.	"Life is Shabby Without You Baby"	S. P. Balasubrahmanyam	S. P. Balasubrahmanyam
3.	"Muddugare Yasoda"	Annamacharya	S. Janaki
4.	"Pibare Rama Rasam"	Sadasiva Brahmendra	S. P. Balasubrahmanyam and S. P. Sailaja

== Awards ==
- Nandi Award for Best Story Writer – 1987 – Jandhyala
- Filmfare Award for Best Film – Telugu – 1987 – G. Subba Rao
