= Allan Heyl =

South African bank robber

George Allan Heyl (died April 17, 2020) was a South African, criminal and member of the Stander Gang.

Heyl met his accomplices André Stander and Lee McCall in 1977, while they were in prison together (Heyl had been sentenced in 1977 for an earlier string of bank robberies); Stander and McCall escaped from prison in August 1983, and broke Heyl out in October of that same year.

The three then began a crime spree, which ended on January 30, 1984, when McCall was killed in a shoot-out with police. Stander, who had travelled to the United States, likewise died in a shoot-out with police there on February 13, 1984.

Heyl had travelled to Britain, where he committed further robberies. These led to his arrest and in 1985, he was tried at Winchester Crown Court and sentenced to nine years in a British prison.

At the end of his British sentence, he was extradited to South Africa, and re-imprisoned on charges pertaining to the Stander Gang robberies. Heyl was serving a sentence of 25 years in Krugersdorp Prison.

== Post-prison activities and release ==
In the 2003 film Stander, Heyl is portrayed by David O'Hara. Heyl, who at the time was still in prison, supplied the filmmakers with much background detail on the gang's practices.

Heyl was paroled in 2005, and became a motivational speaker.

He died on April 17, 2020.
