= Bad Planet =

Comic book limited series

- Cover of the first issue

Publication information
- Publisher: Raw Studios; Image Comics
- Schedule: Irregular
- Format: Limited series
- Genre: Science fiction
- Publication date: December 2005 –
- No. of issues: 8

Creative team
- Created by: Thomas Jane; Steve Niles; Tim Bradstreet; Lewis LaRosa
- Written by: Thomas Jane; Steve Niles; Bruce Jones
- Artist: Greg Staples
- Penciller(s): Lewis LaRosa; James Daly; Dave Kendall
- Inker(s): Tim Bradstreet; James Daly
- Letterer: Jason William Hanley
- Colorist: Grant Goleash
- Editor: Thomas Jane

Bad Planet is an American six-issue comic book limited series written by Thomas Jane and Steve Niles published starting from 2005. It was one of the first comics produced under the writers' own Raw Studios imprint for Image Comics.

The story is about an ancient meteorite containing destructive alien organisms crashing down on Earth in modern times. Another alien, a single warrior, appears on Earth to help prevent its destruction at the hands of the malevolent invaders.

== Publication history ==
Co-creator/co-writer Thomas Jane was "hopped up on Vicodin" while recovering from a car accident when he had a series of fever dreams that contained "horrible alien deathspiders". From those dreams, he formed the idea for the comic book series, Bad Planet.

Jane befriended comic book artist Tim Bradstreet, while the latter was making the promotional posters for the Punisher film, and pitched the idea to him. Bradstreet suggested he approach Bradstreet's long-time friend, Eisner Award-nominated Steve Niles, with the Bad Planet concept. Eventually the three met at a 2004 comic convention in Los Angeles. Niles, famous for his vampire series 30 Days of Night, quickly jumped on the idea and agreed to write. Concerned about the interior artwork in the comic, Jane again asked Bradstreet for advice. Bradstreet had been wanting an opportunity to work with Lewis LaRosa after seeing his work on the Punisher Max Comics series, for which Bradstreet does the covers. LaRosa was planning to leave the comics industry, but was cajoled by Bradstreet and a signed headshot of Jane in the mail.

The team had originally conceived the series as being twelve parts, but it was later changed to six parts. Jane explained that this was because they split the series in half so the team could have a break in the project.

The second issue was cover-dated January 2006 but then the series stalled due to LaRosa's illness. The other creators waited for him to recover, but when he did, he finally decided to leave the industry. It wasn't until mid-2007 that the third issue was released. James Daly took over for issue 4 (November 2007). Issue 5 (April 2008) featured art from Daly, Bradstreet, and Dave Kendall.

After a three-year break, issue 7 was released (June 2011), with Bruce Jones taking over as co-writer from Steve Niles. Issue 8 (February 2013) was released nearly two years after that. Issues 9-12 have been put on hold until Jane and Bradstreet can find more artists and funding to produce them.

== Reception ==
The first issue received a "Must Read" rating from IGN.
