= Cinema Panopticum =

2005 comic book by Thomas Ott

- Date: 2005
- Page count: 104 pages
- Publisher: Edition Moderne

Creative team
- Writer: Thomas Ott
- Artist: Thomas Ott
- ISBN: 978-3-907055-90-8

Cinema Panopticum is a 2005 Swiss comic book by Thomas Ott. It consists of four horror short stories and a frame story where a little girl watches films at an amusement park. It is black-and-white and without dialogue or narration.

== Plot ==
In a frame story called "The Girl", a little girl visits an amusement park, but finds its popular rides too expensive. Behind a roller coaster, she finds a small booth called Cinema Panopticum, which contains boxes that show silent films for one coin each. The girl watches four films, each a horror story with a twist ending.

The first story is "The Hotel", where a man visits a strange, unmanned hotel. In the next, "The Champion", a masked wrestler competes against Death. Next is "The Experiment", where a man with poor eyesight tries a cure. Finally, "The Prophet" is about a homeless man who predicts the end of the world.

== Reception ==
Publishers Weekly wrote that the stories catch both characters and readers in "imaginatively conceived, masterfully executed traps", and are reminiscent of The Twilight Zone. The critic wrote that the storytelling relies on initially familiar situations, slow but steady pace, and understated emotions, which leads to a strong impact. The critic wrote that the drawings are realistic but the black-and-white execution makes the mood expressionistic. Yves-Marie Labé of Le Monde wrote that Cinema Panopticum successfully mixes "despairing coldness and everyday pessimism", calling the book Dantesque and visually a unique blend of fantastic art, horror art, engraving and comics.

Cinema Panopticum was one of five finalists for the 2005 Ignatz Award for Outstanding Graphic Novel. It received the Premio Attilio Micheluzzi for best foreign comic at the 2006 Napoli Comicon.
