= GURPS Supers =

Tabletop role-playing game

- Second edition cover by John Zeleznik
- Designers: Loyd Blankenship
- Publishers: Steve Jackson Games
- Publication: Third edition GURPS: 1989 (first edition); 1990 (second edition); Fourth edition GURPS: 2007 (third edition)
- Genres: Superhero
- Systems: GURPS

GURPS Supers is a superhero roleplaying game written by Loyd Blankenship and published by Steve Jackson Games in 1989.

== Contents ==
GURPS Supers is a supplement of rules for comic-book superhero characters and campaigns for GURPS. The first edition book includes new combat rules, 24 superpowers, bionic superlimbs, gadgets and equipment, and rules for creating new powers, sample heroes and villains, and a briefly described campaign world. The second edition book is revised and corrected.

GURPS Supers deals with super-powered characters in a modern-day setting, and contains all the necessary rules to create superheroes for the GURPS basic system. The book also contains suggestions for running a superhero campaign, and a detailed background setting with the UN controlling most superheroes.

== Setting ==
The official "house setting" for GURPS Supers is the "IST World", described briefly in chapter 7 of GURPS Supers and later appearing in its own full-length supplement, GURPS International Super Teams.

== System ==
GURPS Supers is a supplement for the GURPS roleplaying game and uses that basic rule system. The supplement offers additional rules and options for characters with superpowers.

Players can choose from several different basic types of superhero characters that influence how the character's powers are selected. Players can select from a wide variety of powers and their modifications given in GURPS Supers, augmented by those in the GURPS Basic, plus any other GURPS book included by the campaign. The rules book included advice on creating superhero campaigns, and ways for the game master to customize the style of the campaign.

As part of the GURPS system, GURPS Supers allows the exchange of player characters between any of the numerous other genres supported by GURPS. GURPS Supers favors lower-powered heroes over higher-powered ones. Many of the superpowers unique to GURPS Supers appear as Advantages and Disadvantages in the GURPS 4e Basic Set.

== History ==
GURPS Supers was written by Loyd Blankenship, with a cover by Alan Gutierrez and Charlie Weidman, and was first published by Steve Jackson Games in 1988 as a 112-page book. GURPS Space was one of the broad genre books that was published after the GURPS Basic Set.

The second edition of GURPS Supers was published in 1990 with a cover by John Zeleznik.

=== Earlier editions and supplements ===
The first edition of GURPS Supers was printed in 1989, and the second edition was published in 1990. The first edition had groupings of character powers that were not used in the second edition. Both were based on the third edition of GURPS.

There were various aids, supplements and ready-made adventures available, including:

- GURPS Supers Adventures
- GURPS Supers: Death Wish
- GURPS Supers: Mixed Doubles
- GURPS Supers School of Hard Knocks
- GURPS Supers: Superscum
- GURPS Supers: Supertemps
- Hellboy Sourcebook and Roleplaying Game (based on the Hellboy series)
- GURPS Wild Cards (based on Wild Cards series)
- GURPS Wild Cards: Aces Abroad

=== Fourth edition ===
GURPS Supers for fourth edition was published in 2007.

For the fourth edition of GURPS, the majority of rules governing the creation of superhero characters are covered in the more generic GURPS Powers. A PDF release by William H. Stoddard covers the genre specific information in a similar style to GURPS Fantasy and GURPS Space books for the fourth edition of GURPS.

== Reception ==
In the August 1989 edition of Games International (Issue #8), James Wallis liked the design and layout of the book, but pointed out that "the rewriting of a large number of rules [...] shows that GURPS is not a truly generic rolegame and makes GURPS Supers substantially harder to learn". He disliked the additional complexities around character generation, and was disturbed that the book did not spend much time on the creation of character background, saying this was a failure of the system to properly engage with the nature of comic books. He also commented that GURPS combat was frequently deadly, whereas in comic books combat is not usually lethal. Wallis concluded by giving this book a below average rating of only 2 out of 5: "For my money, GURPS Supers is flawed [...] There is too much emphasis on rules changes; it fails as a superhero rolegame because of the overrealism of the GURPS rules, and it fails as a generic sourcebook because it is not generic".

In the September 1996 edition of Dragon (Issue #233), Rick Swan compared the second edition of GURPS Supers to Champions, and commented that "GURPS Super takes a more realistic route, stressing personality over punch-outs. That's not to say it's stodgy; a typical chapter is titled 'Unnatural Multiple Limbs from Another World'. The Second Edition streamlines the occasionally awkward mechanics of the First Edition and adds some nifty new powers".

In the May 1996 edition of Arcane (issue #6), Steve Faragher gave the second edition of GURPS Supers a below-average rating of only 6 out of 10, and called the background setting "rather dull", saying it is "fine if you want to recreate a Saturday afternoon TV show, but not so great for a more fantastic, underground campaign of the Watchmen variety". Faragher concluded that "it's a competent enough set of rules - and one that's well presented - but GURPS Supers is not exactly compulsive playing material".

== Other reviews ==
- Games Review, vol. 2 #1
- Dragão Brasil (issue #4 - Jul 1995) (Portuguese)
- Dragão Brasil (issue #41 - Aug 1998) (Portuguese)

== See also ==
- List of GURPS publications
