= GURPS Mixed Doubles =

- Designers: Spike Y Jones
- Publishers: Steve Jackson Games
- Publication: 1992; 34 years ago
- Genres: Superhero
- Systems: GURPS

GURPS Mixed Doubles is a sourcebook for GURPS.

== Contents ==
GURPS Mixed Doubles is a collection of characters intended for use with the GURPS role-playing game accessory Supers. Each superhero or supervillain character entry in the book is paired with another one, often with an enemy or a rival, but sometimes with a partner, a relative and, in two cases, lovers.

== Reception ==
Shane L. Hensley reviewed GURPS Mixed Doubles in White Wolf #35 (March/April, 1993), rating it a 3 out of 5 and stated that "Overall, the characters are original and well fleshed out. Each entry has a detailed history, ways to fit it into a campaign, a discussion of his or her abilities, and battle tactics. If the character is too powerful or too weak for a particular campaign, there is even a power variations section to beef up or tone down the offending super."

== See also ==
- List of GURPS publications
