= GURPS Supers School of Hard Knocks =

1989 supplement for the GURPS role-playing game

GURPS Alternate Earths
- Designers: Aaron Allston
- Publishers: Steve Jackson Games
- Publication: 1989; 37 years ago
- Genres: Superhero
- Systems: GURPS third edition

GURPS Supers School of Hard Knocks is an Superhero sourcebook for the GURPS (Generic Universal Role-Playing System), written by Aaron Allston, and published by Steve Jackson Games in 1989.

== Plot summary ==
School of Hard Knocks is an adventure in which the superhero player characters must stop the super-powered teenagers that are causing trouble in town.

== Publication history ==
School of Hard Knocks was written by Aaron Allston, with a cover by David Dorman, and illustrations by Doug Shuler, and was published by Steve Jackson Games in 1989 as a 32-page book.

== Reception ==
Mike Jarvis reviewed School of Hard Knocks for Games International magazine, and gave it 3 stars out of 5, and stated that "I feel this could prove a little tricky for a beginner to handle. On the whole a reasonable effort, but be prepared for a little hard work."

== Reviews ==
- Games Unplugged #3 (Oct./Nov., 2000)

== See also ==
- List of GURPS publications
