= I Melt with You (film) =

- Theatrical release poster
- Directed by: Mark Pellington
- Screenplay by: Glenn Porter
- Story by: Mark Pellington; Glenn Porter
- Produced by: Rob Cowan; Norman Reiss; Mark Pellington; Thomas Jane; Neil LaBute; O'Shea Read
- Starring: Thomas Jane; Jeremy Piven; Rob Lowe; Christian McKay
- Cinematography: Eric Schmidt
- Edited by: Don Broida
- Music by: tomandandy
- Production companies: Media House Capital; Raw Entertainment
- Distributed by: Magnolia Pictures
- Release dates: January 26, 2011 (Sundance); November 4, 2011 (Video on Demand); December 9, 2011
- Running time: 122 minutes
- Country: United States
- Language: English
- Box office: $16,232

I Melt with You is a 2011 American arthouse drama thriller film directed by Mark Pellington. It completed filming in September 2010. It premiered at the Sundance Film Festival in January 2011. The film was met with negative reviews, but has since gained a cult following.

== Plot ==
Friends Ron, Jonathan, Richard and Tim, have known each other since college. They reunite in Big Sur to celebrate Tim's 44th birthday. Each of them enjoy some degree of professional success but are unfulfilled with their lives. Ron is a stockbroker, but is currently facing indictment from the SEC for embezzlement. Jonathan runs a medical practice, but all of his patients are wealthy drug addicts, he and his wife are divorced, and their young son identifies more with the stepfather. Richard is a published author, but has only written one book, now teaches high school English and has no one in his life outside of his friends. Tim, openly bisexual, was in a happy relationship with a man, until accidentally causing a fatal car crash five years ago that took the lives of his boyfriend and his sister.

The four friends party for several days at a beach side mansion, during which the men consume massive quantities of drugs provided by Jonathan, including prescription opioids and marijuana. They head into town for food and to pick up women, where Richard convinces a young waitress to bring her friends back to the house. Tim engages in a three-way with two of the revelers, during which they role play the parts of Tim's dead boyfriend and sister. The next morning, Tim hangs himself. The three friends find him, along with a suicide note reminding them of a suicide pact they made in 1986—promising that they would kill themselves together if they found life unfulfilling in middle age. Afraid that the police will blame them for Tim's death, they bury him on the beach behind the house. Ron does not believe they should fulfill the suicide pact, which results in Richard and Jonathan mocking him as a coward and a liar. Ron goes to the airport to return home, but cannot bring himself to board the plane after listening to worrisome voicemails from his wife, indicating that federal agents are waiting to arrest him. He rejoins Richard and Jonathan at the mansion.

The men eat lunch at a restaurant where an elderly man goes into cardiac arrest. Jonathan saves his life, drawing the attention of police Officer Boyde. Coming to the house to thank Jonathan, Boyde encounters an inebriated and agitated Ron. Believing that Boyde knows something is wrong, Ron attempts to get her to leave, raising Boyde's suspicions.

Richard finds Ron in his room, unwilling to return home to the waiting federal agents. He tells Richard that he regrets his actions, cannot face his wife and family, and would rather die than face the consequences. Richard agrees to help him end his suffering and smothers him with a pillow. The next morning, Richard and Jonathan bury Ron beside Tim.

Richard and Jonathan go into town to party, where Richard provokes two young men into beating him up. Jonathan, having decided to end his life, calls his son, asking the boy to promise him to remember who his real father was. After Jonathan's ex-wife interrupts, he gives himself a fatal overdose of an intravenous sedative. Richard, looking for Jonathan to tell him he does not want to go through with the suicide pact, finds his body. He buries Jonathan beside the others.

Boyde, increasingly suspicious of the men's behavior, decides to visit the mansion the next morning. She finds a disturbed Richard has covered the inside of the house in artistic recreations of the text of the suicide pact. Richard tells that his friends are dead and then flees in a sports car, leading Boyde on a high speed chase to the Point Sur Lighthouse. When Boyde arrives, she finds Richard's car with the suicide pact on the front seat and Richard near the edge of the ocean cliffs. Boyde attempts to talk Richard away from the edge, but Richard states he would "miss his friends too much" and jumps. The film ends with the voices of the four friends, each narrating a line from the suicide pact.

== Cast ==
- Jeremy Piven as Ron
- Rob Lowe as Jonathan
- Thomas Jane as Richard
- Carla Gugino as Laura Boyde
- Arielle Kebbel as Randi
- Sasha Grey as Raven
- Christian McKay as Tim
- Tom Bower as Captain Bob
- Joe Reegan as Cole
- August Emerson as Ethan
- Victoria Bruno as Carrie
- David Lowe as Officer Stevens

== Reception ==
On the review aggregator website Rotten Tomatoes, 16% of 44 critics' reviews are positive. The website's consensus reads: "Presenting itself as profound while relying entirely on shock factor, I Melt With You subjects its audience to a misanthropic marathon of bad behavior that's about as fun as a mid-life crisis." Metacritic, which uses a weighted average, assigned the film a score of 26 out of 100, based on 13 critics, indicating "generally unfavorable" reviews.

== See also ==
- List of American films of 2011
