= Give 'Em Hell, Malone =

- Directed by: Russell Mulcahy
- Written by: Mark Hosack
- Produced by: Erik Anderson; Johnny Martin; Brian Oliver; Richard Rionda Del Castro; Richard Salvatore
- Starring: Thomas Jane; Ving Rhames; Elsa Pataky
- Cinematography: Jonathan Hall
- Edited by: Robert A. Ferretti
- Music by: David C. Williams
- Production companies: Malone Productions; North by Northwest Productions; Continental Entertainment Capitol; Blue Rider Finance
- Distributed by: Hannibal Pictures
- Release dates: July 25, 2009 (Comic-Con International); January 26, 2010 (United States)
- Country: United States
- Language: English
- Budget: $15 million

Give 'Em Hell, Malone is a 2009 American neo-noir action thriller film directed by Russell Mulcahy and starring Thomas Jane, Ving Rhames and Elsa Pataky.

== Plot ==
A former-private-eye-turned-gun-for-hire named Malone is hired to retrieve a suitcase from a building full of armed mobsters, but a violent shootout ensues and Malone is eventually left as the only survivor. Suspecting a set-up, he retains the only noteworthy item contained in the case - a small painted animal referred to as "the meaning of love" - for himself, prompting several different parties in the employ of a local gangster - Whitmore - to pursue Malone in attempt to discern the meaning of the case's contents.

After a series of violent encounters leaving many dead, Malone eventually confronts Whitmore, who admits he was responsible for hiring Malone and planted the toy - a keepsake belonging to Malone's young son - as a means to trick Malone into exterminating Whitmore's criminal help, allowing Whitmore to become a legitimate businessman without worrying about being tainted by potential loose ends from his criminal past. Malone kills Whitmore and phones his (Malone's) wife and son - previously presumed dead - but does not engage them in conversation.

A title-over at the end reads, "To Be Continued...".

== Cast ==
- Thomas Jane as Malone
- Ving Rhames as "Boulder"
- Elsa Pataky as Evelyn
- French Stewart as Frankie "The Crooner"
- Leland Orser as Murphy
- Chris Yen as "Mauler"
- William Abadie as "Pretty Boy"
- Gregory Harrison as Whitmore
- Doug Hutchison as "Matchstick"

== Release ==
The film was released on DVD and Blu-ray January 26, 2010.

=== Critical reception ===
Tyler Foster of DVD Talk gave the film a negative review, calling it "a movie that's groan-worthy when it follows the beaten path and annoying when it tries to subvert it" and unfavorably compared it to Frank Miller's The Spirit. Brian Pisco for Pajiba had similar feelings, stating that the film "sets up asskickery that never comes about.".

== Sequel ==
A sequel to the film was announced in 2021, with Jane and Hosack returning as actor and screenwriter respectively.
