= Lee McCall =

South African bank robber (1950–1984)

Lee McCall (1950 – 30 January 1984) was a member of the Stander Gang, a group of three escaped convicts who went on a bank robbing spree in South Africa from October 1983 until February 1984. The group was named for Andre Stander, who gained fame for having been a Captain of Detectives in the Johannesburg Police when he started his individual crime spree before being arrested. The third member was Allan Heyl.

Lee McCall was the only gang member with whom the South African police managed to catch up before he could flee the country. Several call girls who the gang had employed at their safehouse from time to time assisted the police in locating the hideout. They moved on the location early in the morning on 30 January 1984. At the time that their SWAT units surrounded the house, only McCall was present. Stander was in Fort Lauderdale trying to get a rented house on his name. Heyl was still in South Africa, possibly at one of the gang's two other safehouses. McCall wouldn't surrender himself. He instead starting looking out of several windows in different rooms, attempting to ascertain whether the policemen were trying to maneuver their way into the house surreptitiously. He then shot himself.
