= Daughter of Darkness =

Daughter of Darkness may refer to:

- Daughter of Darkness (1948 film), a British film
- Daughters of Darkness, a 1971 Belgian horror film
- Daughter of Darkness (1990 film), a film made for television
- Daughter of Darkness (1993 film), a Hong Kong horror film
- "Daughter of Darkness" (song), a 1970 song by Tom Jones
- Daughter of Darkness (novel), a 1973 thriller by a husband and wife writing as J.R. Lowell
- Daughters of Darkness and the Chronicles of Santon, a 1990 RuneQuest adventure
- Tenchi the Movie 2: The Daughter of Darkness, a 1997 anime film
- Daughter of Darkness, a 2009 album by experimental folk duo Natural Snow Buildings
