= Asylum (Seabrook book) =

1935 memoir by William Seabrook

- First edition cover
- Author: William Seabrook
- Language: English
- Genre: Memoir
- Publisher: Harcourt Brace
- Publication date: 1935

Asylum, also known as Asylum (An Alcoholic Takes the Cure), is a memoir by American travel writer William Seabrook, first published in 1935 by Harcourt Brace. The book documents Seabrook's experiences in Bloomingdale Asylum in New York, where he was committed from 1933 to 1934 or 1935 for his alcoholism.

Asylum is mentioned, though not by name, in The Crack-Up, a 1945 posthumous collection of essays by F. Scott Fitzgerald. Asylum was republished in 1947 by Bantam Books, and again in 2015 by Dover Publications.

== Critical reception ==
In 2015, Ryan Holiday of the Observer called Asylum "not just quite possibly one of the first modern addiction/recovery memoirs, but perhaps the most honest and haunting accounts of the struggle for mental health in literature."
