= Marjorie Muir Worthington =

American writer (1900–1976)

Marjorie Muir Worthington (1900 – February 17, 1976) was an American writer of novels and short stories.

== Life ==
Worthington was born in 1900 in New York City. She was inspired by the arts as a child, and studied at New York University School of Journalism.

In 1926, Worthington traveled to Paris where she joined ranks with other expatriate American artists and writers who were living there. Here she met the author William Seabrook. They often socialized with Ford Madox Ford, Sinclair Lewis, Gertrude Stein, Alice B. Toklas, Aldous Huxley, Thomas Mann, and Walter Duranty while in France.

In 1932, Seabrook and Worthington went to Africa to gather background material for a book he was writing. They returned to France after the trip and married in 1935 but ended up divorcing in 1941.

While traveling the world, Worthington continued her writing. She had eleven of her novels published as well as many of her short stories. These stories appeared in magazines such as Vogue, McCall's, Vanity Fair, Harper's, and Cosmopolitan. During the 1950s and 1960s, she began writing biographies, three of which were published. Her last major work was her book about Seabrook which was published in 1966.

== Personal life ==
Worthington was married and divorced three times. While in New York studying journalism, she met and married her first husband, Carlton Beecher Stetson. Her second husband was Lyman Worthington, whom she divorced in 1932. Her third marriage with William Buehler Seabrook lasted from 1935 to 1941, before it ended due to his alcoholism and sadism. They had met for the first time in Paris 1926.

== Death ==
Worthington died aged 76 on February 17, 1976, of cancer.

== Writings ==
Articles:

- The Red Gingham Fairy (by Erick Berry and Marjorie Worthington, McCall's, Oct. 1927)

Short stories:

- At the Spa (Harper's Magazine, July 1939)
- The Green-Eyed Cat (Harper's Magazine, Feb. 1942)
- The Black Market (Collier's, Oct. 1942)
- A Lady Comes Home (Cosmopolitan, Mar. 1943)
- One Night in the Rain (Cosmopolitan, Dec. 1943)
- Perfect Daughter (McCall's, Sept. 1954)
- Forgive Us Our Debts (McCall's, Feb. 1956)

Novels:

- Spider Web (1930)
- Mrs. Taylor (1932)
- Scarlet Josephine (1933)
- Come, My Coach (1935)
- Manhattan Solo (1937)
- The House on the Park (1946)
- The Enchanted Heart (1950)

Children's books:

- Bouboukar, Child of the Sahara (1962)

Biographies:

- Miss Alcott of Concord (1958)
- The Immortal Lovers: Heloise and Abelard (1962)
- The Strange World of Willie Seabrook (1966)
