= Bedouin =

Nomadic Arab tribes

بَدْو (Arabic) badw
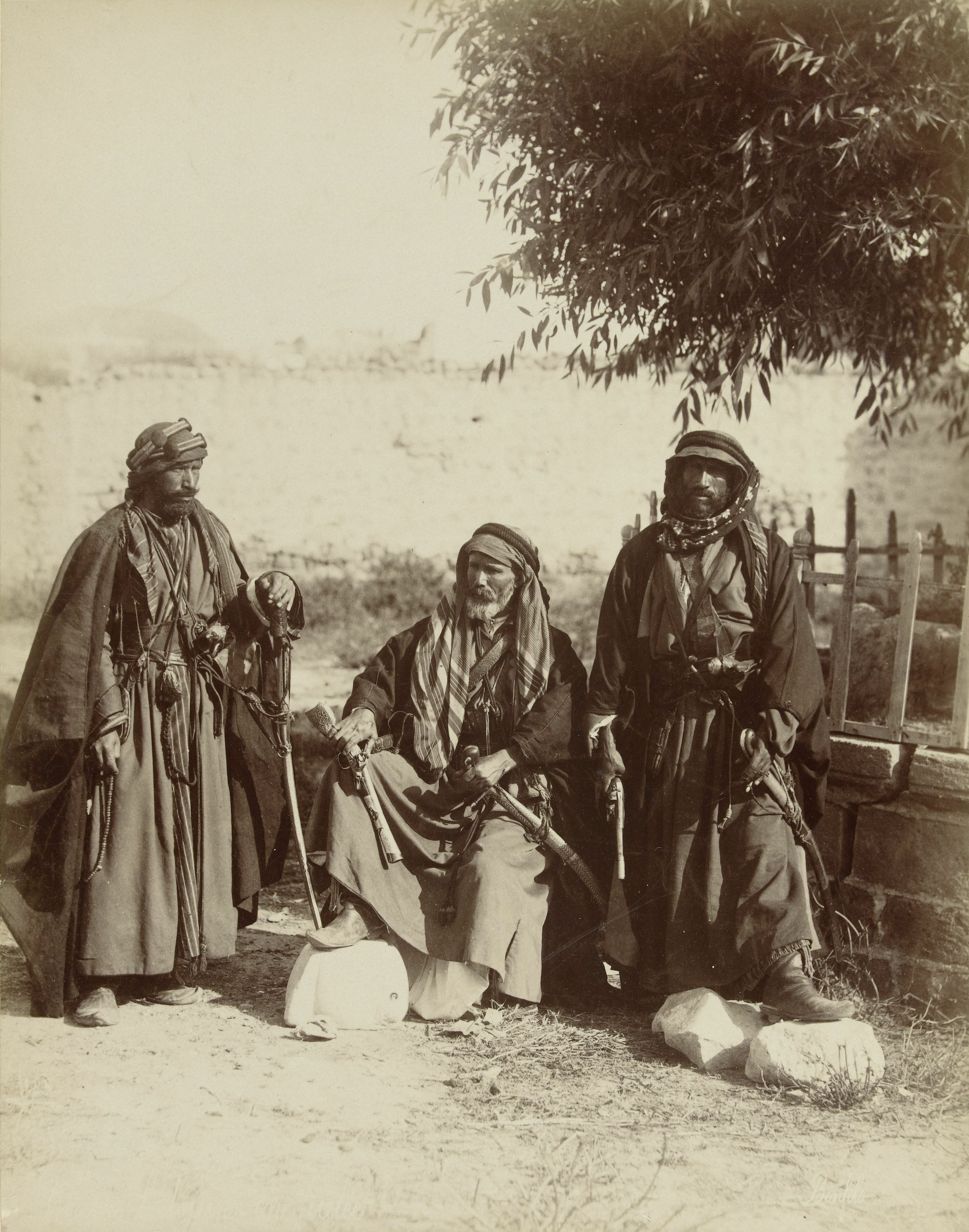
- Three Bedouin sheikhs, c. 1867–1876

Total population
- 25,000,000

Regions with significant populations
- Arabian Peninsula, Levant, North Africa
- Sudan: 10,000,000
- Algeria: 2,000,000–6,000,000
- Saudi Arabia: 2,000,000
- Iraq: 1,500,000
- Jordan: 1,300,000
- Libya: 1,000,000
- Egypt: 1,000,000
- (United Arab Emirates) UAE: 800,000
- Syria: 1,500,000
- Yemen: 500,000
- Kuwait: 300,000
- Morocco: 250,000
- Oman: 250,000
- Israel: 220,000
- Lebanon: 200,000
- Tunisia: 180,000–2,600,000
- Mauritania: 100,000
- Bahrain: 70,000
- Qatar: 50,000
- Palestine: 30,000–40,000

Languages
- Bedouin Arabic

Religion
- Predominantly Sunni Islam; Minority Shia Islam

Related ethnic groups
- Other Arabs and Afro-Asiatic speakers

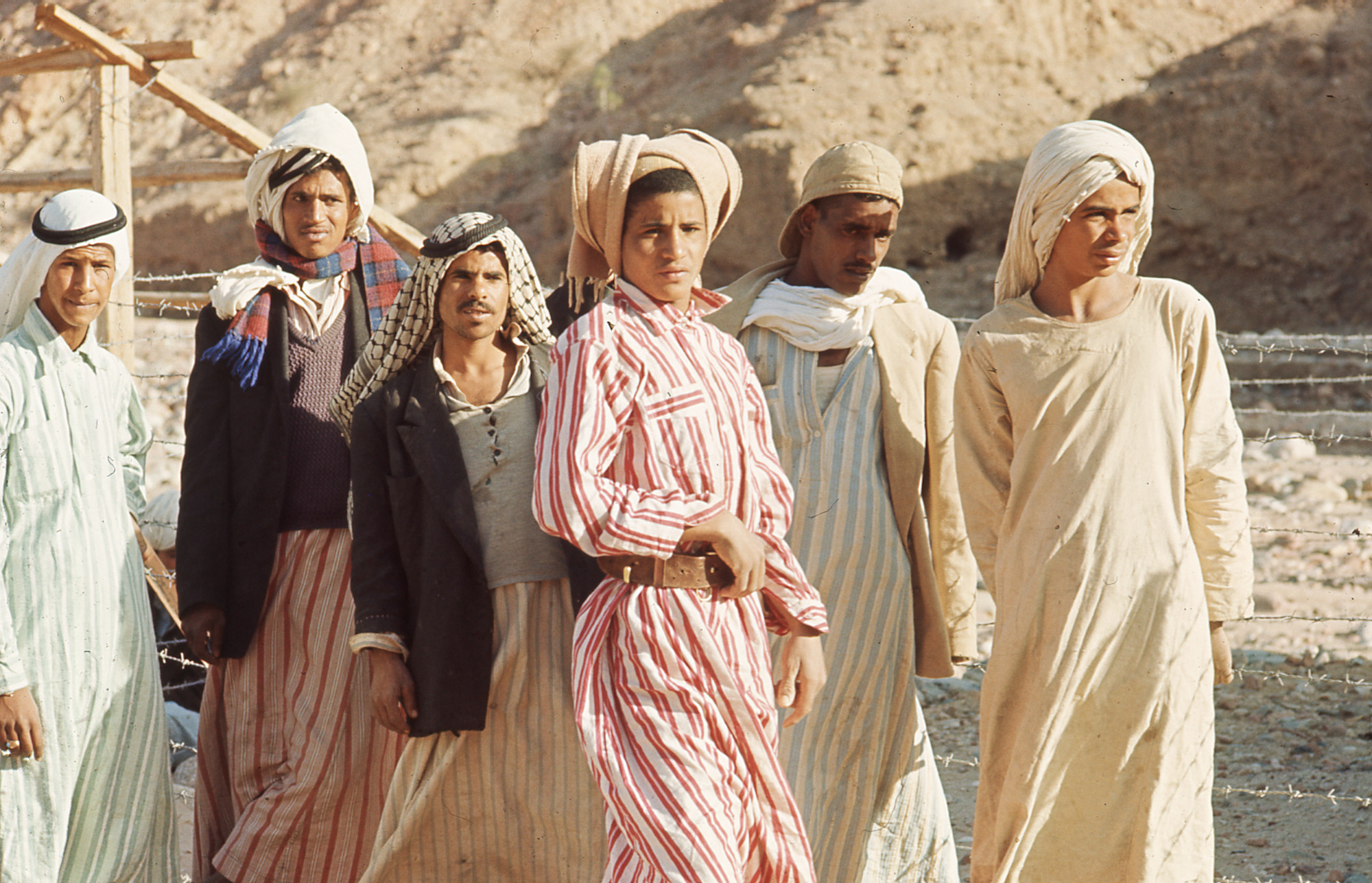
Bedouins in the Sinai Region, 1967

The Bedouin, Beduin, or Bedu (/ˈbɛduɪn/ BED-oo-in; Arabic: بَدْو, romanized: badw, singular بَدَوِي badawī) are pastorally semi-nomadic Arab tribes who have historically inhabited the desert regions in the Arabian Peninsula, North Africa, the Levant, and Mesopotamia (Iraq). The Bedouin originated in the Syrian Desert and Arabian Desert but spread across the rest of the Arab world in West Asia and North Africa after the spread of Islam. The English word bedouin comes from the Arabic badawī, which means "desert-dweller", and is traditionally contrasted with ḥāḍir, the term for sedentary people. Bedouin territory stretches from the vast deserts of North Africa to the rocky ones of the Middle East. They are sometimes traditionally divided into tribes, or clans (known in Arabic as ʿašāʾir; عَشَائِر or qabāʾil قبائل), and historically share a common culture of herding camels, sheep and goats. The vast majority of Bedouins adhere to Islam, although there are a small number of Christian Bedouins present in the Fertile Crescent until the 21st century.

Bedouins have been referred to by various names throughout history, including Arabaa by the Assyrians (ar-ba-ea), being a nisba of the noun Arab, a name still used for Bedouins today. They are referred to as the ʾAʿrāb (أعراب) in Arabic. While many Bedouins have abandoned their nomadic and tribal traditions for a modern urban lifestyle, others retain traditional Bedouin culture such as the traditional ʿašāʾir clan structure, traditional music, poetry, dances (such as saas), and many other cultural practices and concepts. Some urbanized Bedouins organise cultural festivals, usually held several times a year, in which they gather with other Bedouins to partake in and learn about various Bedouin traditions—from poetry recitation and traditional sword dances to playing traditional instruments and even classes teaching traditional tent knitting. Traditions like camel riding and camping in the deserts are still popular leisure activities for urban Bedouins who live near deserts or other wilderness areas.

== Society ==
A widely quoted Bedouin adage is "I am against my brother, my brother and I are against my cousin, my cousin and I are against the stranger" sometimes quoted as "I and my brother are against my cousin, I and my cousin are against the stranger." This saying signifies a hierarchy of loyalties based on the proximity of some person to oneself, beginning with the self, and proceeding through the immediate family as defined by male kinship, and then, in principle at least, to an entire genetic or linguistic group (which is perceived as akin to kinship in the Middle East and North Africa generally). Disputes are settled, interests are pursued, and justice and order are dispensed and maintained by means of this framework, organized according to an ethic of self-help and collective responsibility (Andersen 14). The individual family unit (referred to as a tent or bayt) usually traditionally comprised three or four adults (a married couple plus siblings or parents) and any number of children.

Bedouin tribes were not controlled by a central power, like a government or empire, but rather were led by tribal chiefs. Some chiefs exercised their power from oases, where merchants would organise trade through the territory controlled by the tribe. The structure of Bedouin tribes was held together by shared feelings of common ancestry rather than by a tribal chief atop the hierarchy.

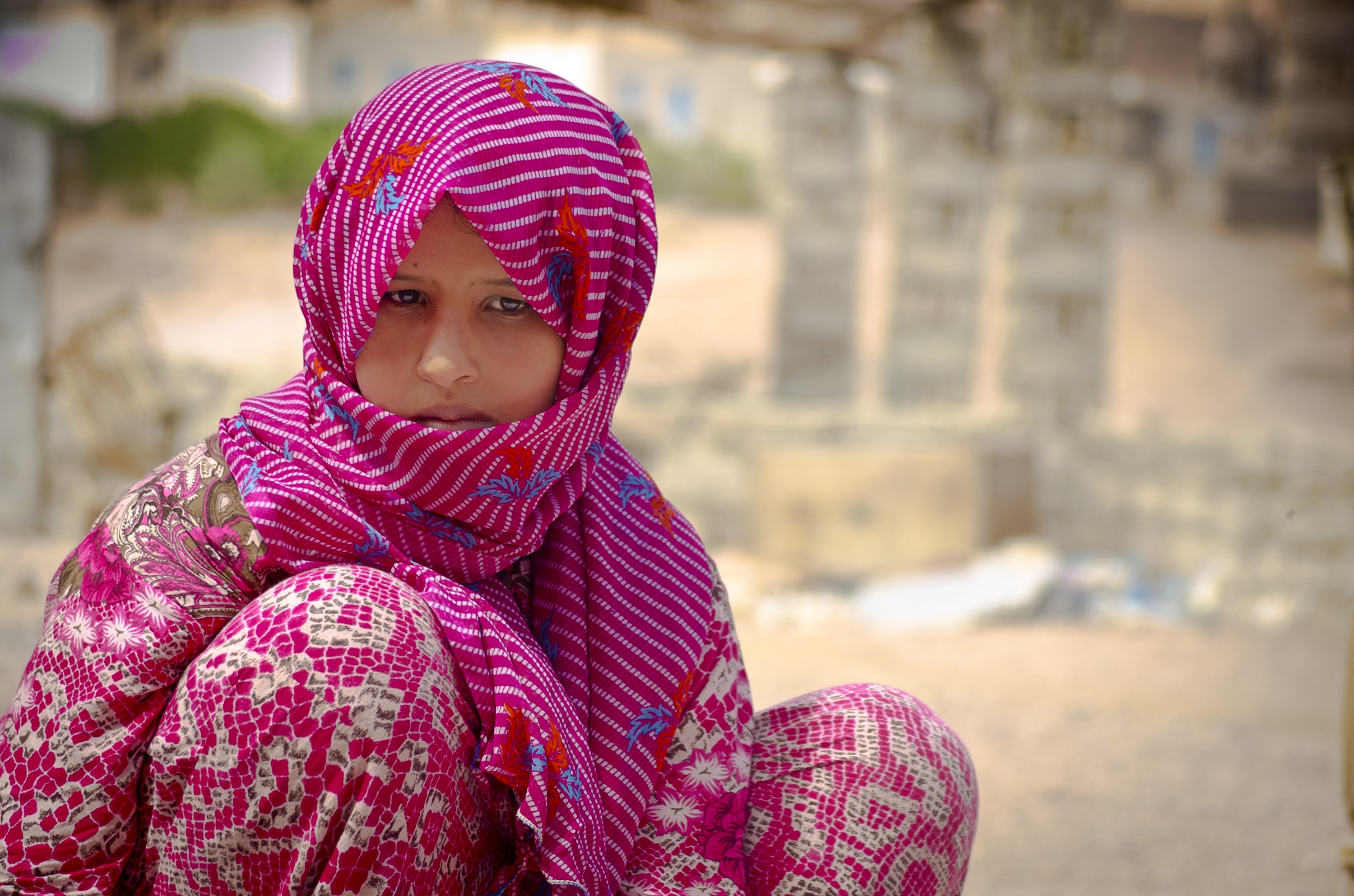
A Bedouin girl in Nuweiba, Egypt (2015)

The Bedouins' ethos comprises courage, hospitality, loyalty to family and pride of ancestry. Bedouin society typically revolved around traditional honor codes of the Bedouin, and Bedouin systems of justice, such as the well known bisha'a, or ordeal by fire, a well-known Bedouin practice of lie detection.

== Traditions ==
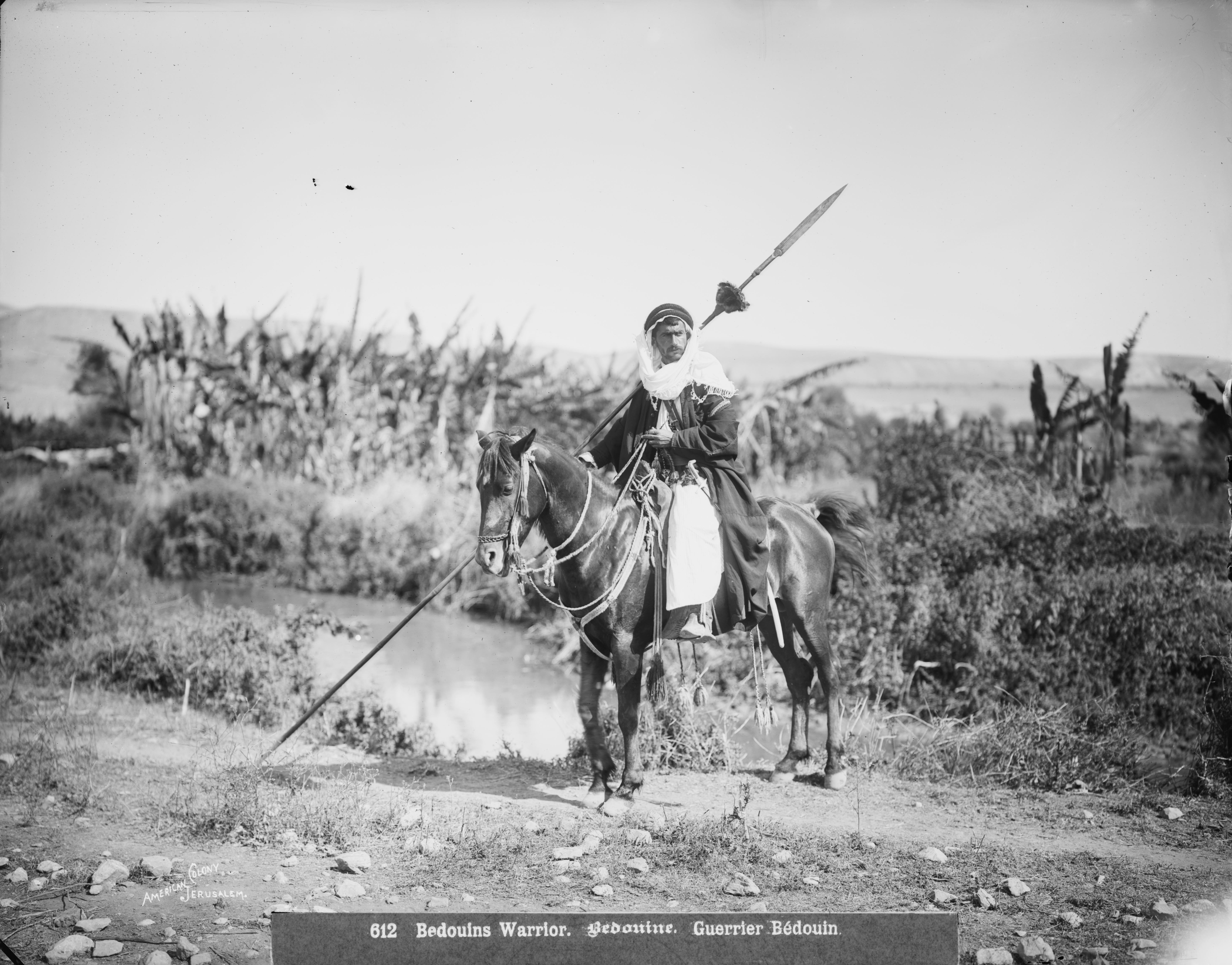
A Bedouin warrior, pictured between 1898 and 1914

=== Herding ===
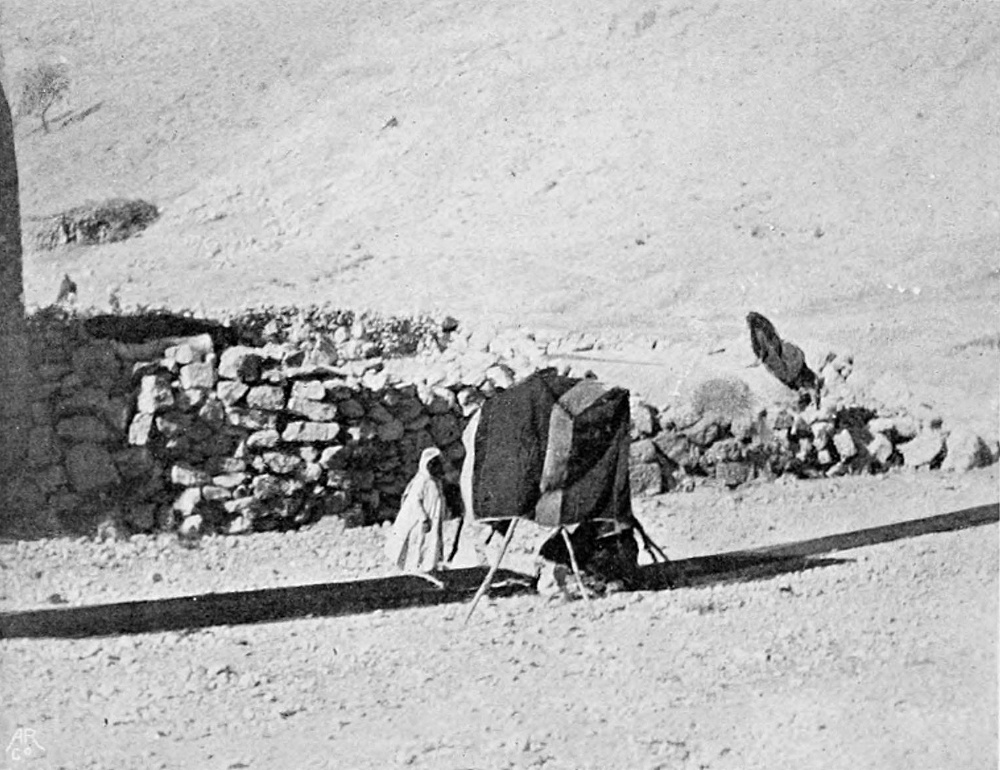
Weaving lengths of fabric for tent making using ground loom. Palestine, c. 1900

Livestock and herding, principally of goats, sheep and dromedary camels comprised the traditional livelihoods of Bedouins. These were used for meat, dairy products, and wool. Most of the staple foods that made up the Bedouins' diet were dairy products.

Camels, in particular, had numerous cultural and functional uses. Having been regarded as a "gift from God", they were the main food source and method of transportation for many Bedouins. In addition to their extraordinary milking potentials under harsh desert conditions, their meat was occasionally consumed by Bedouins. As a cultural tradition, camel races were organized during celebratory occasions, such as weddings or religious festivals.

Some Bedouin societies live in arid regions. In areas where rainfall is very unpredictable, a camp will be moved irregularly, depending on the availability of green pasture. Where winter rainfall is more predictable in regions further south, some Bedouin people plant grain along their migration routes. This proves a resource for the livestock throughout the winter. In regions such as western Africa, where there is more predictable rainfall, the Bedouin practice transhumance. They plant crops near permanent homes in the valleys where there is more rain and move their livestock to the highland pastures.

=== Oral poetry ===
Oral poetry is the most popular art form among Bedouins. Having a poet in one's tribe was highly regarded in society. In addition to serving as a form of art, poetry was used as a means of conveying information and social control. Bedouin poetry, also known as nabati poetry, is often recited in the vernacular dialect. In contrast, the more common forms of Arabic poetry are often in Modern Standard Arabic.

=== Raiding or ghazw ===
The well-regulated traditional habit of Bedouin tribes of raiding other tribes, caravans, or settlements is known in Arabic as ghazw.

=== Coffee ===
A bedouin man in Transjordan crushing the coffee beans in the Mihbaj.

Among the Bedouins of the Arabian Peninsula, the Levant, Egypt, and Iraq, coffee is considered a major aspect of hospitality. Traditionally, the Bedouins prepare the coffee in front of the guest by roasting the coffee beans in a pan called a mihmas (also known as a tawa or qallaiya), crushing them in a mortar and pestle called a mihbaj (also known as a nijr, azzam, or jurn), boiling them in a pot called a dallah (also known as a bakraj), and serving it in a small, handleless cup typically called a finjan.

== History ==
=== Early history ===
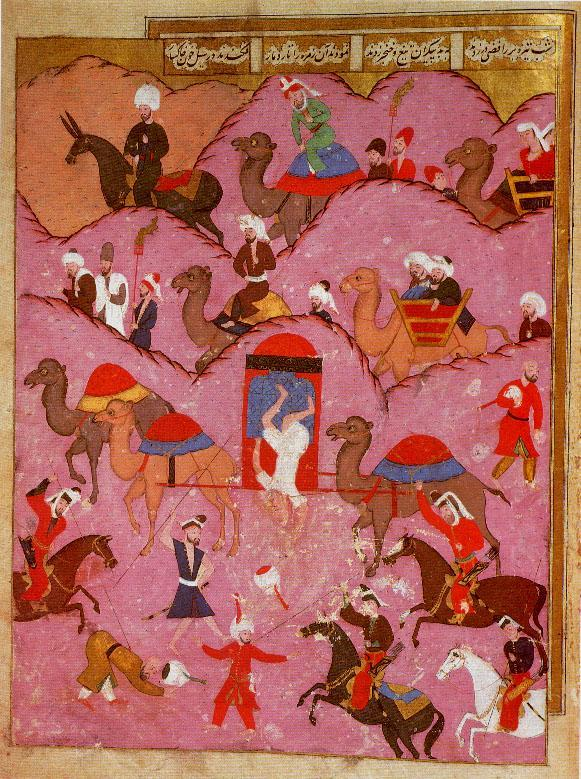
Murder of Ma'sum Beg, the envoy of the Safavid Shah Tahmasp, by Bedouins in the Hejaz, 16th century

Historically, the Bedouin engaged in nomadic herding, agriculture and sometimes fishing in the Syrian steppe since 6000 BCE. By about 850 BCE, a complex network of settlements and camps was established. The earliest Arab tribes emerged from Bedouins.

By the time of the Roman Empire's establishment, the Bedouin national identity had been established and they were recognizable as a single people with often warring "families, clans, and tribes". A major source of income was the taxation of caravans and tributes collected from non-Bedouin settlements. They also earned income by transporting goods and people in caravans pulled by domesticated camels across the desert. Scarcity of water and of permanent pastoral land required them to move constantly.

The Moroccan traveller ibn Battuta reported that in 1326 on the route to Gaza, the Egyptian authorities had a customs post at Qatya on the north coast of Sinai. Here, Bedouin were used to guard the road and track down those trying to cross the border without permission.

Arabic-speaking scholars of the Islamic Golden Age sought to develop a standardized form of Classical Arabic for maximal intelligibility across the Arab world. They believed that the Bedouin spoke the purest, most conservative variety of the language. To solve irregularities of pronunciation, the Bedouin were asked to recite certain poems, whereafter consensus was relied on to decide the pronunciation and spelling of a given word.

=== Ottoman period ===
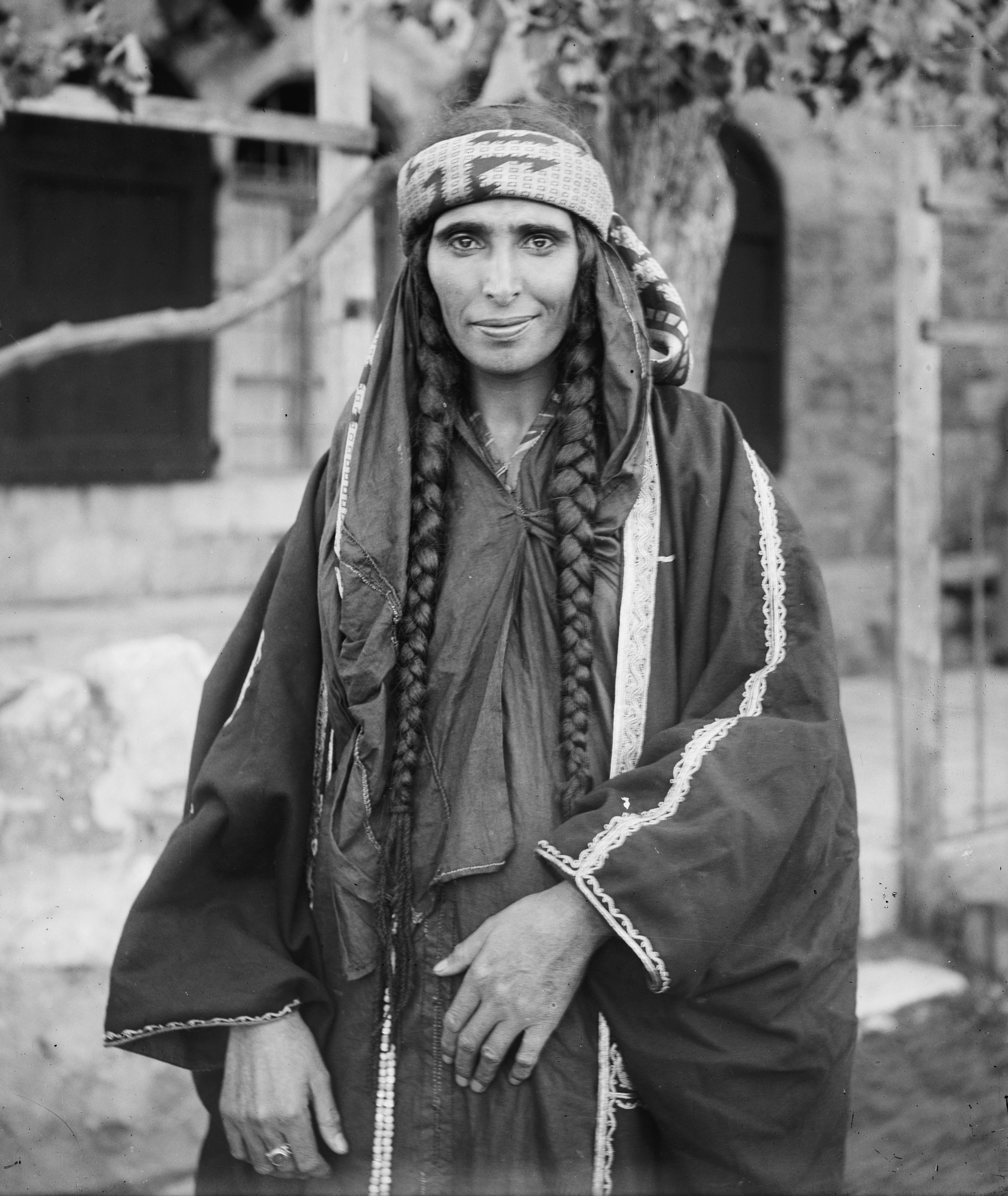
Arab Christian Bedouin woman from the settled town of Kerak, Jordan, who probably was the wife of a sheikh. Braids were predominantly worn by Arab Christian Bedouin women of the tribes of Jordan.

Historically, the nomadic Bedouin tribes engaged in frequent inter-tribal warfare, conducting seasonal raids (known as ghazu) against rival clans for access to scarce pasturages and water resources. One notable example was the long-standing rivalry between the Shammar and Anizah tribal confederations across northern Arabia and the Syrian Desert. During the late 18th century, these conflicts, together with the rise of the Wahhabi movement, contributed to the migration of a major Shammar faction under the Al Jarba family across the Euphrates into Upper Mesopotamia, where it later emerged as a dominant tribal force.

A plunder and massacre of the Hajj caravan by Bedouin tribesmen occurred in 1757, led by Qa'dan al-Fayez of the Bani Sakher tribe (modern-day Jordan) in his vengeance against the Ottomans for failing to pay his tribe for their help protecting the pilgrims. An estimated 20,000 pilgrims were either killed in the raid or died of hunger or thirst as a result including relatives of the sultan and Musa Pasha. Although Bedouin raids on Hajj caravans were fairly common, the 1757 raid represented the peak of such attacks which was also likely prompted by the major drought of 1756.

Under the Tanzimat land reforms of 1858, a new Ottoman land law was issued, which offered legal grounds for the displacement of the Bedouin (Turkish: Bedeviler). As the Ottoman Empire gradually lost power, this law instituted an unprecedented land registration process that was also meant to boost the empire's tax base. Few Bedouin opted to register their lands with the Ottoman Tapu, due to lack of enforcement by the Ottomans, illiteracy, refusal to pay taxes and lack of relevance of written documentation of ownership to the Bedouin way of life at that time. Some scholars, such as Nora Elizabeth Barakat, believe the displacement of the Bedouin had its roots in events even earlier than the 1858 land reforms, for example in an 1844 Anatolia-specific decree recognizing the "tribe" as a formal unit of administration. The goal of these early reforms was to weaken local Bedouin magistrates and limit what she terms as "rural mobility", the ability of these local Bedouins to, independently of the Ottoman state, accumulate wealth through the wheat trade and other means.

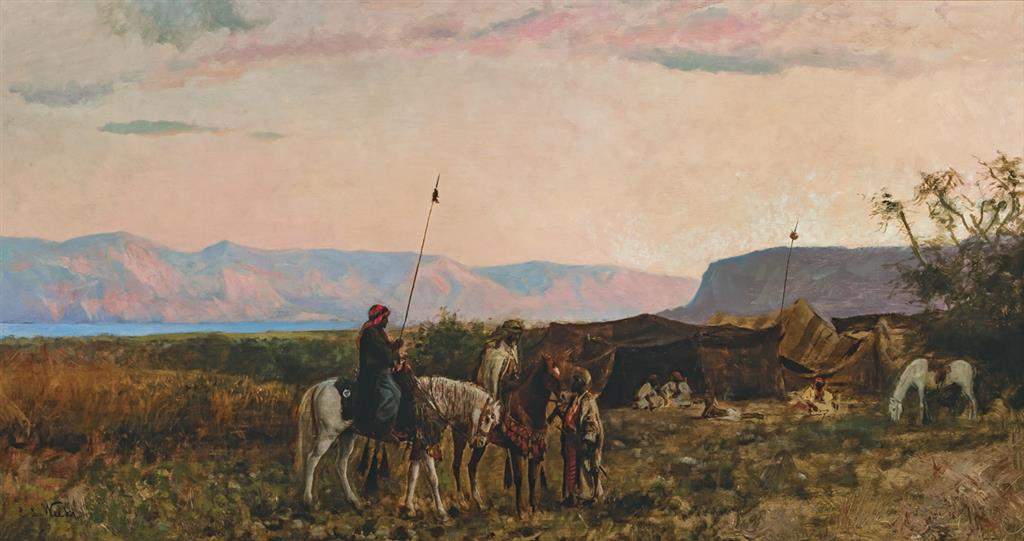
Bedouin encampment near the Dead Sea

At the end of the 19th century, Sultan Abdülhamid II settled Muslim populations (Circassians) from the Balkans and the Caucasus among areas predominantly populated by the nomads in the regions of modern Syria, Lebanon, Jordan, and Palestine, and also created several permanent Bedouin settlements, although the majority of them did not remain. The settlement of non Arabs in the traditionally Bedouin areas was a big cause of discontent. This became even more severe because every Arab tribe, including the settled ones, have ancestry as a Bedouin.

Ottoman authorities also initiated private acquisition of large plots of state land offered by the sultan to the absentee landowners (effendis). Numerous tenants were brought in order to cultivate the newly acquired lands. Often it came at the expense of the Bedouin lands.

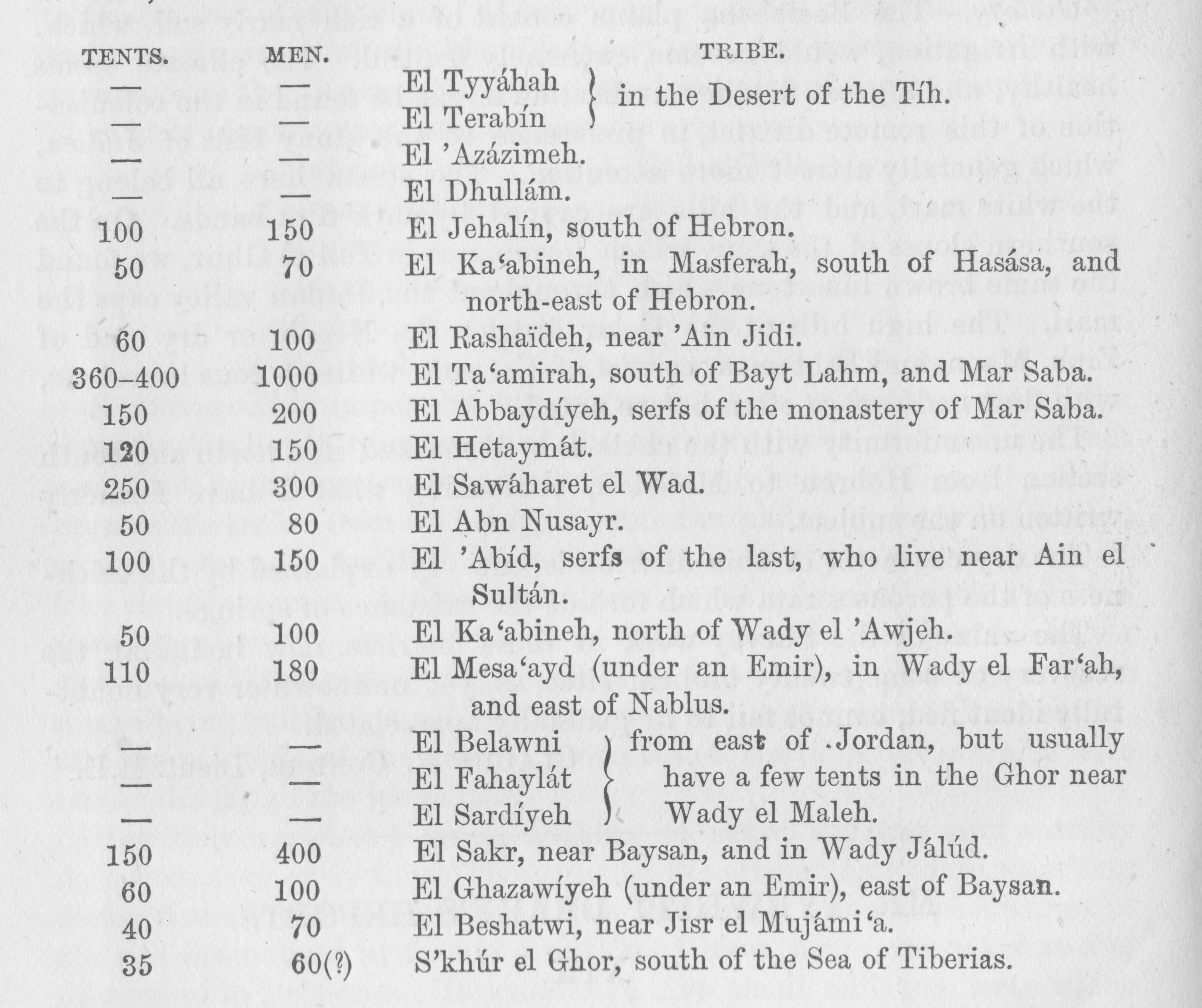
Palestine Exploration Fund list of Bedouin tribes living West of the River Jordan in 1875.

In the late 19th century, many Bedouin began transition to a semi-nomadic lifestyle. One of the factors was the influence of the Ottoman authorities who started a forced sedentarization of the Bedouin living on its territory. The Ottoman authorities viewed the Bedouin as a threat to the state's control and worked hard on establishing law and order in the Negev. During the First World War, the Negev Bedouin initially fought with the Ottomans against the British. However, under the influence of British agent T. E. Lawrence, the Bedouins switched side and fought against the Ottomans. Hamad Pasha al-Sufi (died 1923), Sheikh of the Nijmat sub-tribe of the Tarabin, led a force of 1,500 men who joined the Ottoman raid on the Suez Canal.

In Orientalist historiography, the Negev Bedouin have been described as remaining largely unaffected by changes in the outside world until recently. Their society was often considered a "world without time". Recent scholars have challenged the notion of the Bedouin as 'fossilized,' or 'stagnant' reflections of an unchanging desert culture. Emanuel Marx has shown that Bedouin were engaged in a constantly dynamic reciprocal relation with urban centers. Bedouin scholar Michael Meeker explains that "the city was to be found in their midst."

At the time of World War I, a Qays Bedouin tribe from Harran, not far from Urfa, settled in Lüleburgaz in East Thrace under their last Sheikh Salih Abdullah. It is said that this tribe was originally from Tihamah.

=== In the 20th century ===
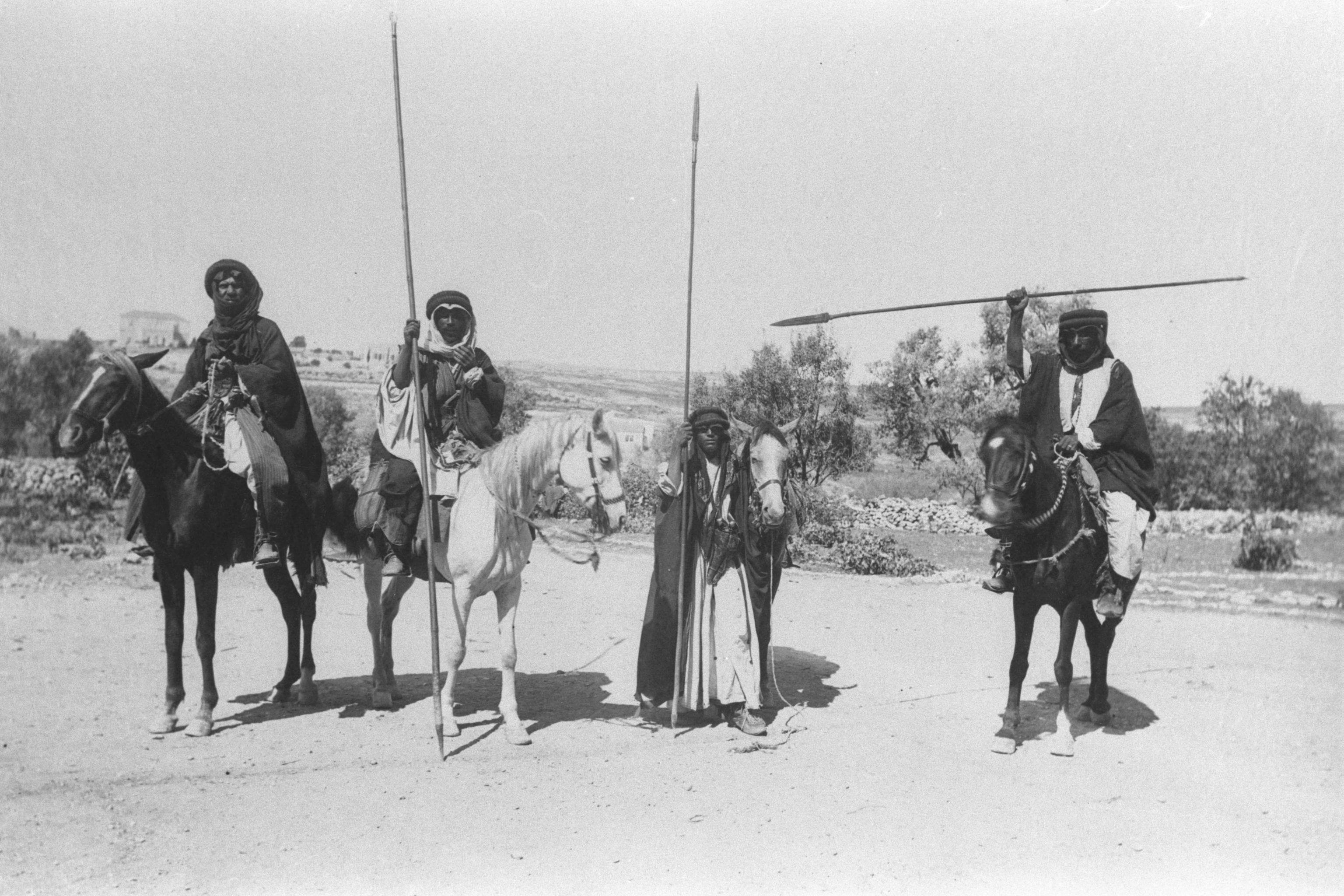
Mounted Bedouin near Jerusalem, 1909, Ottoman Palestine

Ghazzu was still relevant to the Bedouin lifestyle in the early 20th century. After a 1925 stay with Sheikh Mithqal Al-Fayez of the Bani Sakher, William Seabrook wrote about his experience of a ghazzu from the Sardieh tribe on Mithqal's 500 Hejin racing camels. The ghazzu was intercepted by Mithqal when he was notified about the Sardieh tribe's intentions from a man from the Bani Hassan tribe, who rode continuously for over 30 hours to reach Mithqal before their plot matured. Mithqal, using the information, prepared a trap for them, which resulted in the imprisonment of one of the Sardieh warriors. William notes that although the warrior was a prisoner, he was nonchalant and was not treated aggressively, and that the ghazzu wasn't a war, but a game in which camels and goats were the prizes.

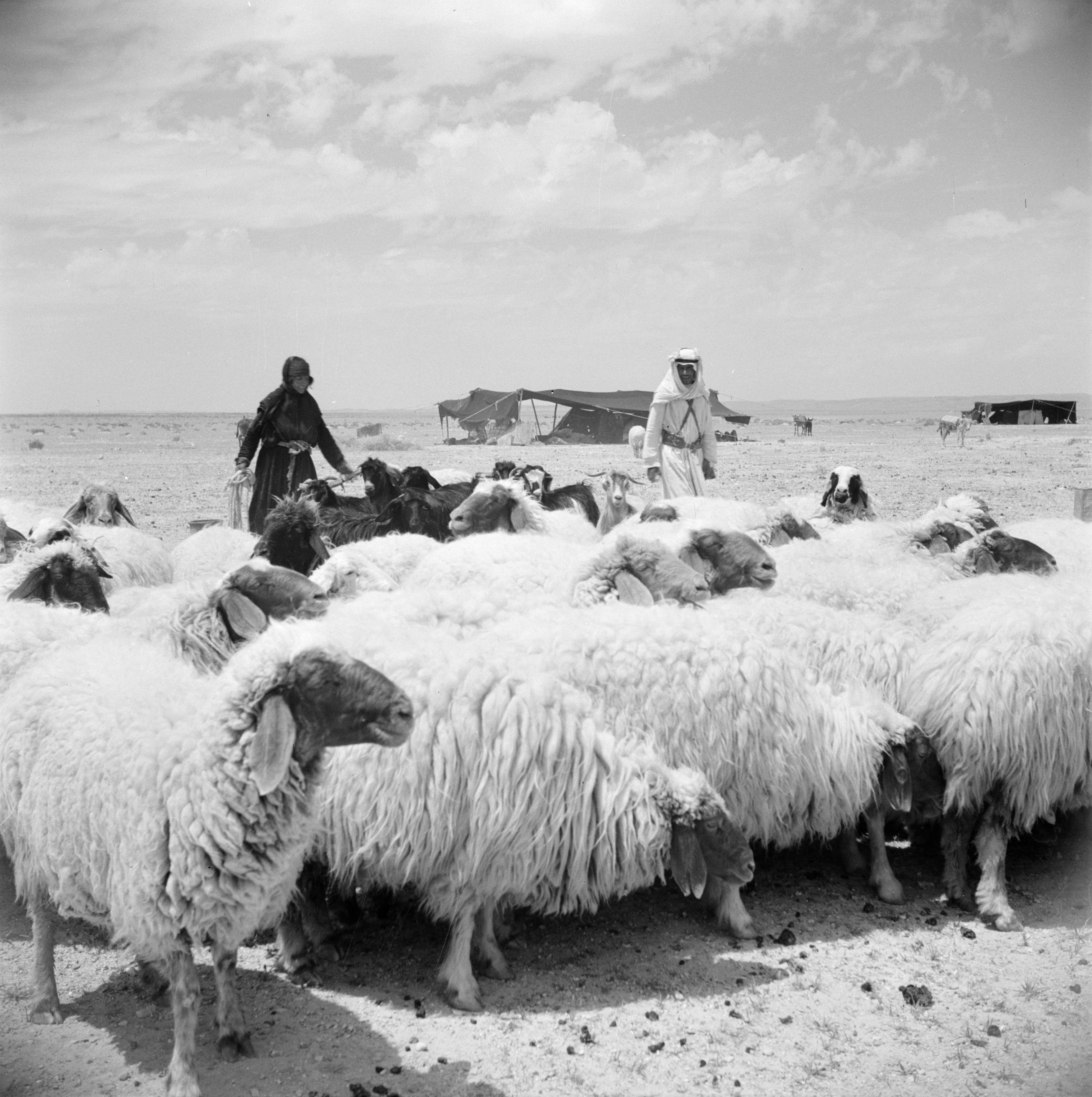
Bedouins in Syria in the 1950s

In the 1950s and 1960s, large numbers of Bedouin throughout Midwest Asia started to leave the traditional, nomadic life to settle in the cities of Midwest Asia, especially as hot ranges shrank and populations grew. For example, in Syria, the Bedouin way of life effectively ended during a severe drought from 1958 to 1961, which forced many Bedouin to abandon herding for standard jobs. West Asian and North African states pushed the Bedouin toward settlement through sedentarization. This process was endorsed by the Arab League and the United Nations, who saw Bedouin lifestyles as “backward." Some Bedouin were also voluntarily drawn to sedentary lifestyles by a desire for improved standards of living.

Governmental policies pressing the Bedouin have in some cases been executed in an attempt to provide service (schools, health care, law enforcement and so on—see Chatty 1986 for examples), but in others have been based on the desire to seize land traditionally roved and controlled by the Bedouin.

Scholars have questioned to what extent Bedouin were “detribalized” by sedentism. Donald B. Cole, for instance, wrote that Bedouin people retain social tribal lineages, but shed their former tribal political, economic, or legal structures when permanently settling.

=== In the 21st century ===
Gulf States and their tourist industries have revived or invented certain Bedouin traditions including falconry, horse and camel races, and pearl-diving, in an attempt to curate national histories and cultures, often in an orientalist manner.

To reconnect with their own heritage, some Bedouin have begun breeding white doves, while others have learned skills in falconry.

== In different countries ==
=== Saudi Arabia ===
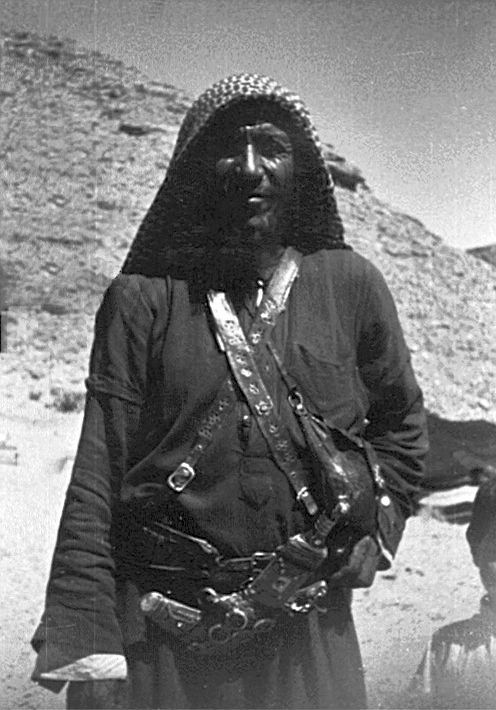
Bedouin man in Riyadh, 1964.

The Arabian Peninsula was one of the original homes of the Bedouin. From there, they started to spread out to surrounding deserts, forced out by the lack of water and food. According to tradition, Arabian Bedouin tribes are descendants of two groups: Qahtanis, also known as Yaman, who originate from the mountains of Southwestern Arabia, and claim descent from a semi-legendary ancestral figure, Qahtan (often linked to the biblical Joktan), and Adnanis, who originate in North-Central Arabia and claimed descent from Adnan, a descendant of the Biblical Ishmael.

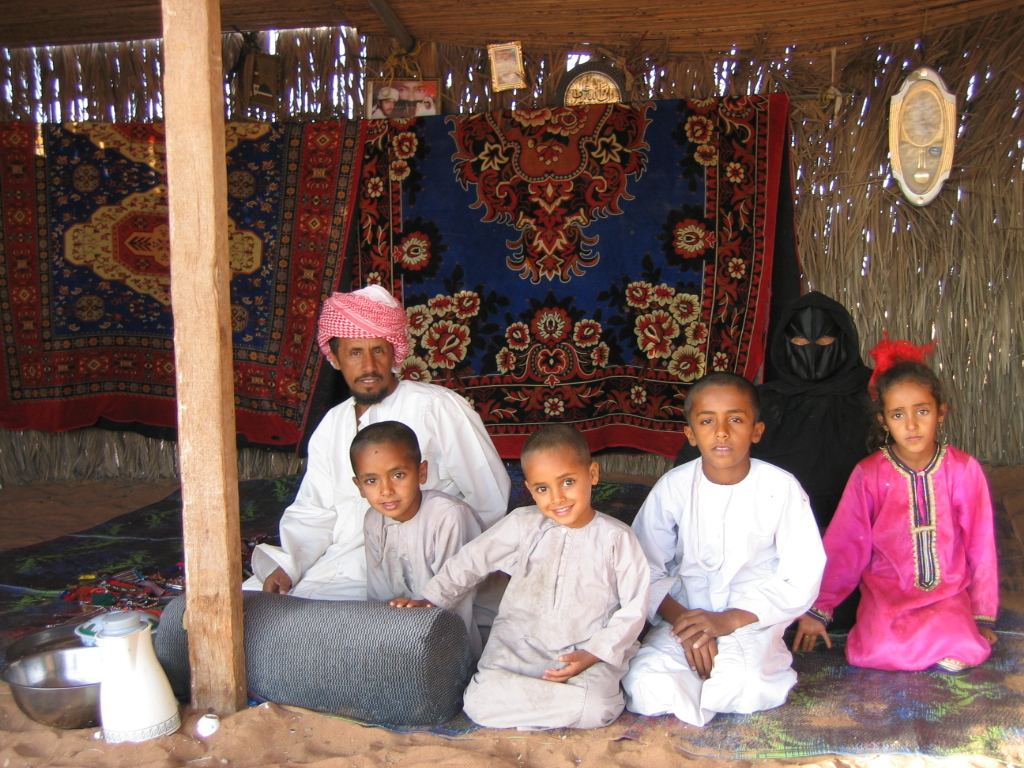
A Bedouin family in Sharqiya Sands, Oman.

A number of Bedouin tribes reside in Saudi Arabia. Among them are Anazzah, Juhaynah, Shammar, al-Murrah, Mahra, Dawasir, Harb, Ghamid, Mutayr, Subay', 'Utayba, Bani Khalid, Bani 'Uqbah, Qahtan, Rashaida, and Banu Yam. Saudi Arabia pursued a policy of sedentarization in the early 20th century, which was initially linked with the establishment of the Ikhwan. As a result of this policy and subsequent modernization, the number of Bedouin that retain their nomadic lifestyle has decreased rapidly.

According to Ali Al-Naimi, the Bedouin, or Bedu, would travel in family and tribal groups, across the Arabian Peninsula in groups of fifty to a hundred. A clan was composed of a number of families, while a number of clans formed a tribe. Tribes would have areas reserved for their livestock called dirahs, which included wells for their exclusive use. They lived in black goat-hair tents called bayt al-shar, divided by cloth curtains into rug-floor areas for males, family and cooking. In Hofuf, they bartered their sheep, goats and camels, including milk and wool, for grain and other staples. Al-Naimi also quotes Paul Harrison's observation of the Bedouin, "There seems to be no limit at all to their endurance."

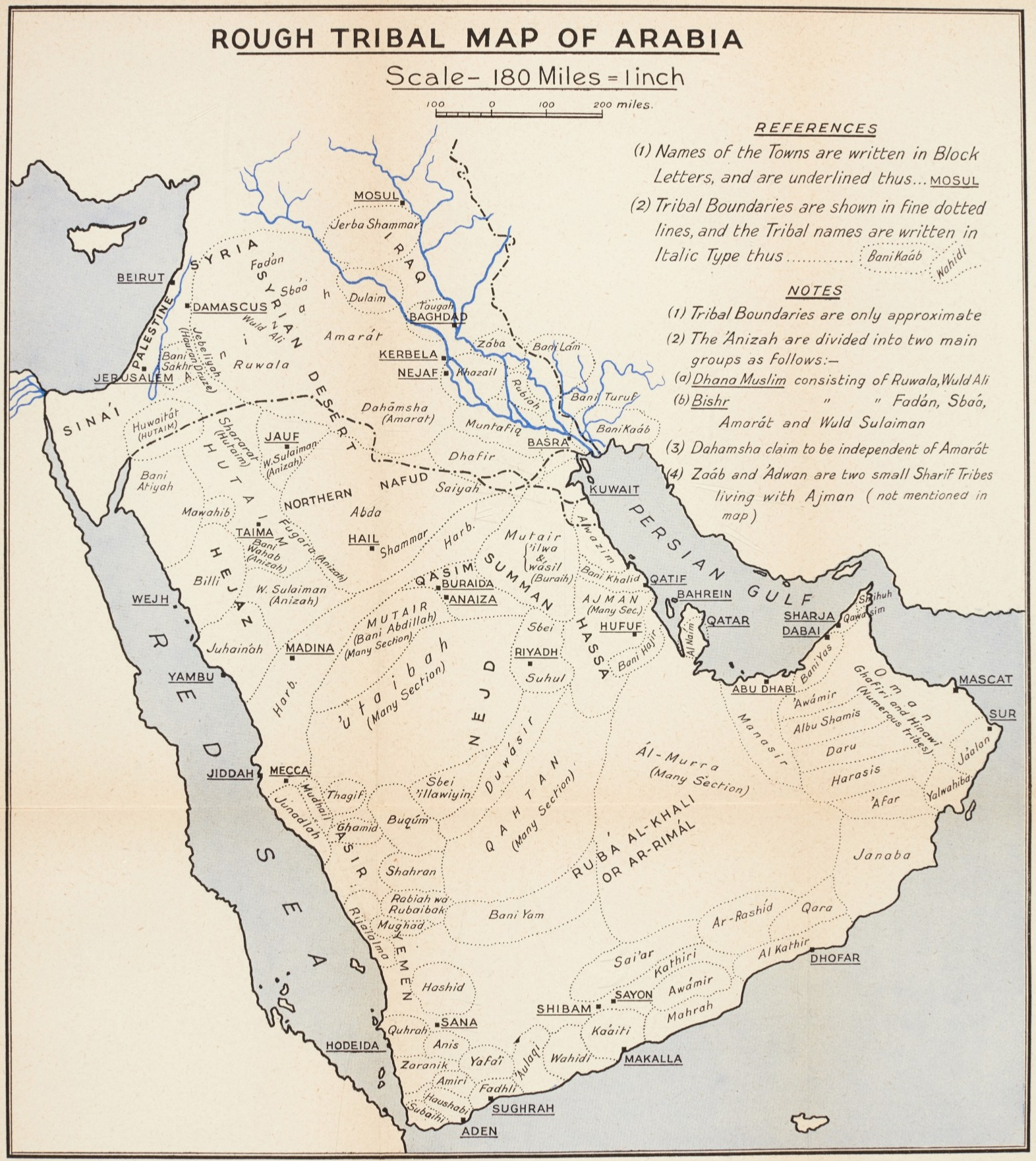
A map published by the British academic Harold Dixon during World War I, showing the presence of the Arab tribes in West Asia, 1914

=== Kuwait ===
In the 1960s and 1970s in Kuwait, politicians enfranchised Bedouin at the Saudi Arabian border and gave them passports to increase support for the fragile parliament. Despite Kuwait being a highly urbanized state with little to no remaining nomadic population, politicians have also since weaponized perceived differences between the hadar (sedentary Arabs) and Bedouins, to emphasize who does and does not deserve citizenship.

=== Qatar ===
After the 1996 Qatari coup attempt, the Qatari government jailed multiple members of the al-Murrah tribe which supported Saudi Arabia, and temporarily revoked the citizenship of 4,000-10,000 tribe members. Many remained incarcerated until 2010, when King Abdullah of Saudi Arabia requested their release. Qatar obliged, flying them to Saudi Arabia.

During the 2017 Gulf blockade of Qatar, the Saudi government encouraged Qatari Bedouin to assemble on the Saudi side of the Saudi Arabia-Qatar border, leading Qatar to revoke the passports of about fifty al-Murrah members. Among those targeted was al-Murrah head Shaikh Taleb bin Lahom bin Shuraim. In Qatar, according to David B. Roberts, many citizens use passports to obtain schooling, health care, unemployment benefits, and job opportunities.

=== Syria ===
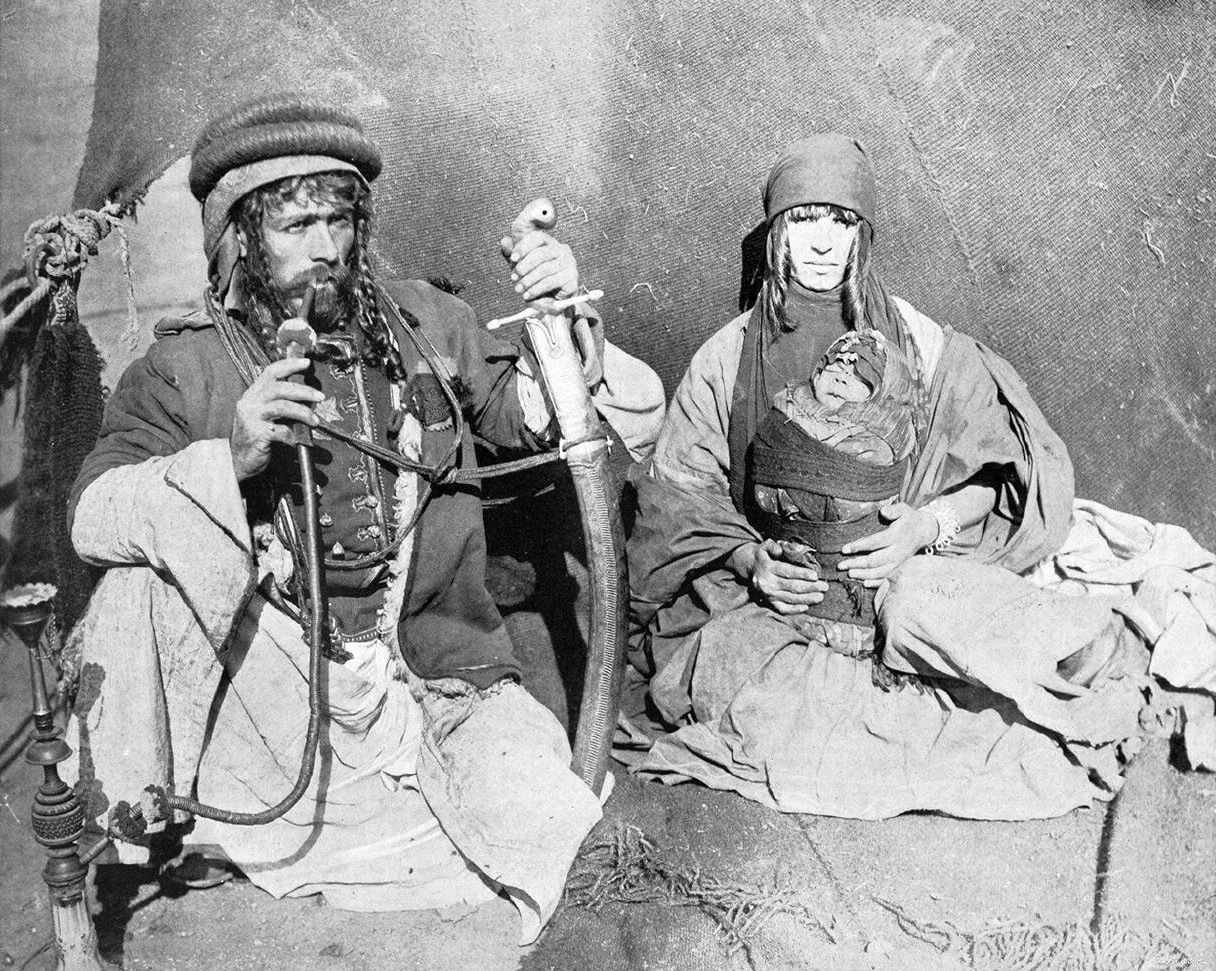
Syrian bedouin, 1893

The Syrian Desert was the original homeland of the Arab Bedouin tribes which were mentioned in the Neo-Assyrian era, where they were referred to by Tiglath-Pileser III as being among the Syrians integrated into the Assyrian administrative system. Today there are over a million Bedouin living in Syria, making a living herding sheep and goats. The largest Bedouin clan in Syria is called Ruwallah who are part of the 'Anizzah' tribe. Another famous branch of the Anizzah tribe is the two distinct groups of Hasana and S'baa who largely arrived from the Arabian peninsula in the 18th century.

Herding among the Bedouin was common until the late 1950s, when it effectively ended during a severe drought from 1958 to 1961. Due to the drought, many Bedouin were forced to give up herding for standard jobs. Another factor was the formal annulling of the Bedouin tribes' legal status in Syrian law in 1958, along with attempts of the ruling Ba'ath Party regime to wipe out tribalism. Preferences for customary law ('urf) in contrast to state law (qanun) have been informally acknowledged and tolerated by the state in order to avoid having its authority tested in the tribal territories. In 1982 the al-Assad family turned to the Bedouin tribe leaders for assistance during the Muslim Brotherhood uprising against al-Assad government (see 1982 Hama massacre). The Bedouin sheikhs' decision to support Hafez al-Assad led to a change in attitude on the part of the government that permitted the Bedouin leadership to manage and transform critical state development efforts supporting their own status, customs and leadership.

There are numerous types of Bedouins in Syria:

Hourani Bedouins, which are from the Daraa Governorate & Quneitra Governorate, these Bedouins are closely related to Jordanians.

Mesopotamian Bedouins, which are from East and South of the Aleppo Governorate, Raqqa Governorate, Al-Hasakah Governorate & Deir ez-Zor Governorate, these Bedouins are closely related to Iraqis.

There are also a few Bedouin tribes in the Rif Dimashq Governorate, Homs Governorate, and Hama Governorate.

Many Syrians have some Arab origin if not predominantly Arab. Religion does not play a role in the genetic makeup of a Syrian. There are Christian Syrians who have a more predominant Arab origin than Muslim Syrians. Therefore many Syrians have some sort of Bedouin Arab origin, since Arabs migrated from Yemen and Saudi Arabia into Syria.

As a result of the Syrian Civil War, some Bedouins became refugees and found shelter in Jordan, Turkey, Lebanon, and other states.

=== Lebanon ===
Bedouins are concentrated in the Beqaa Governorate, although they form a minority there. Many Lebanese people from all over Lebanon have some Arab Bedouin origins, since Arabs migrated to Lebanon from Yemen & Saudi Arabia.

In the present day, Bedouin communities, particularly in Lebanon’s southern border region, have undergone significant socio-cultural changes, shifting from a traditionally nomadic lifestyle to settled farming, including tobacco cultivation. Additionally, increased border demarcations, such as those between Lebanon and Israel, have separated many Bedouin families, although kinship ties do remain. Bedu have become increasingly connected to the sectarian political system. According to Munira Khayyat, "[t]oday the main identifying quality of bedu, like all of the communities that inhabit the borderland (and all citizens of Lebanon), is their sectarian identity", with Bedouin communities being "claimed and cultivated".

=== Palestine ===
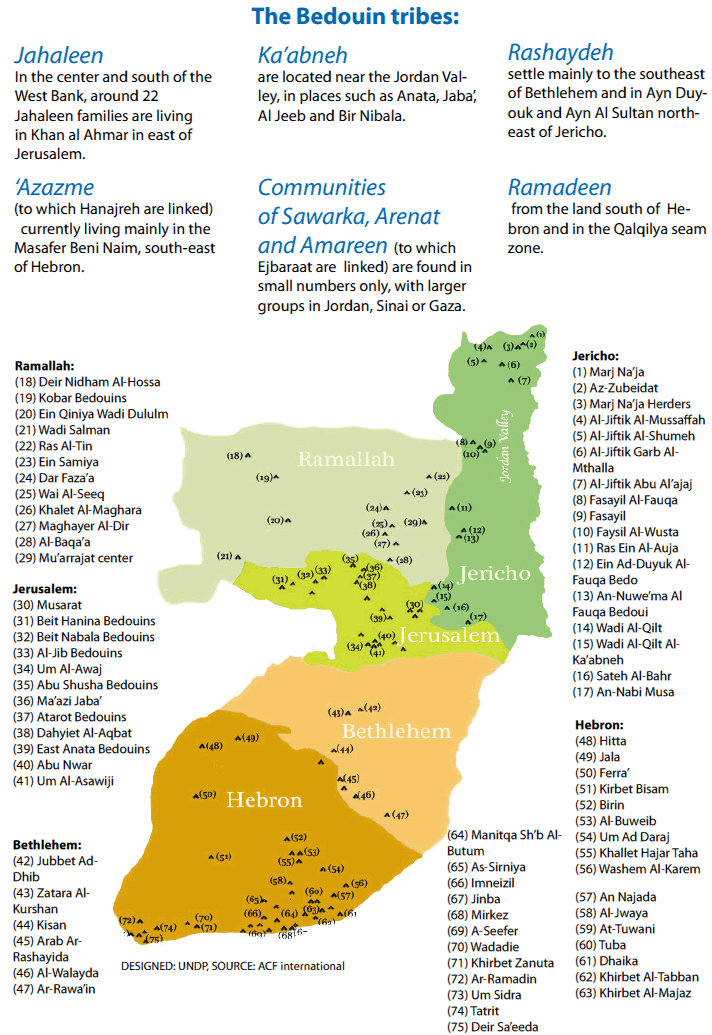
Bedouin tribes in the West Bank

Palestinian Bedouins were originally from the Negev Desert. In the course of the 1948 Palestine war, they fled or were displaced from their land. Other Bedouins were expelled from the Negev in 1953 and relocated to the West Bank, which at the time was under the administration of Jordan. Today, there are 40,000 Bedouins in the whole of the West Bank, including 27,000 people under Israeli military control in Area C. Unlike Negev Bedouins, West Bank Bedouins are not Israeli citizens. Bedouin communities in the West bank have been targeted with forcible relocations to townships to accommodate the growth of illegal Israeli settlements on the outskirts of East Jerusalem. Bedouins also live in the Gaza Strip, including 5,000 in Om al-Nasr. However, the number of nomadic Bedouins is shrinking and many are now settled.

=== Israel ===
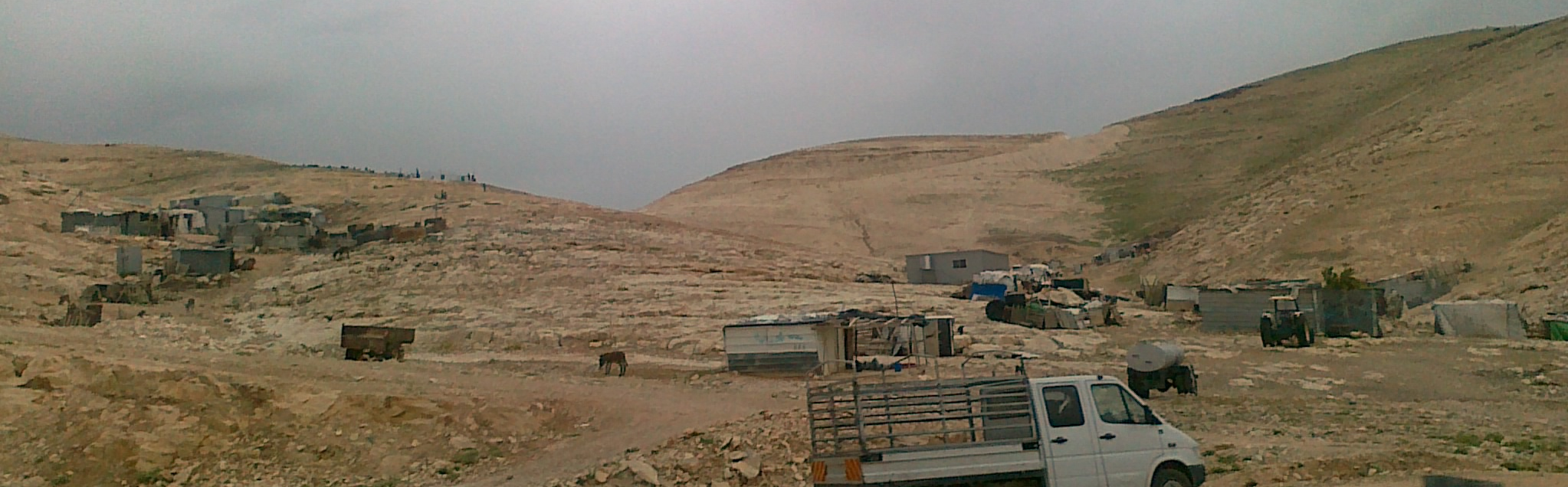
Bedouin encampment in the Negev Desert

Prior to the 1948 Israeli Declaration of Independence, an estimated 65,000–90,000 Bedouins lived in the Negev desert. According to Encyclopedia Judaica, 15,000 Bedouin remained in the Negev after 1948; other sources put the number as low as 11,000. Another source states that in 1999 110,000 Bedouins lived in the Negev, 50,000 in the Galilee and 10,000 in the central region of Israel. All Bedouins residing in Israel were granted citizenship in 1954. As of 2020, there are 210,000 Bedouins in Israel: 150,000 in the Negev, 50,000 in Galilee and the Jezreel Valley, and 10,000 in the central region of Israel. Galilee Bedouins have been living in the northern part of Israel for four centuries. Today, they live in 28 settlements in the north. They also live in mixed villages with non-Bedouin Arabs.

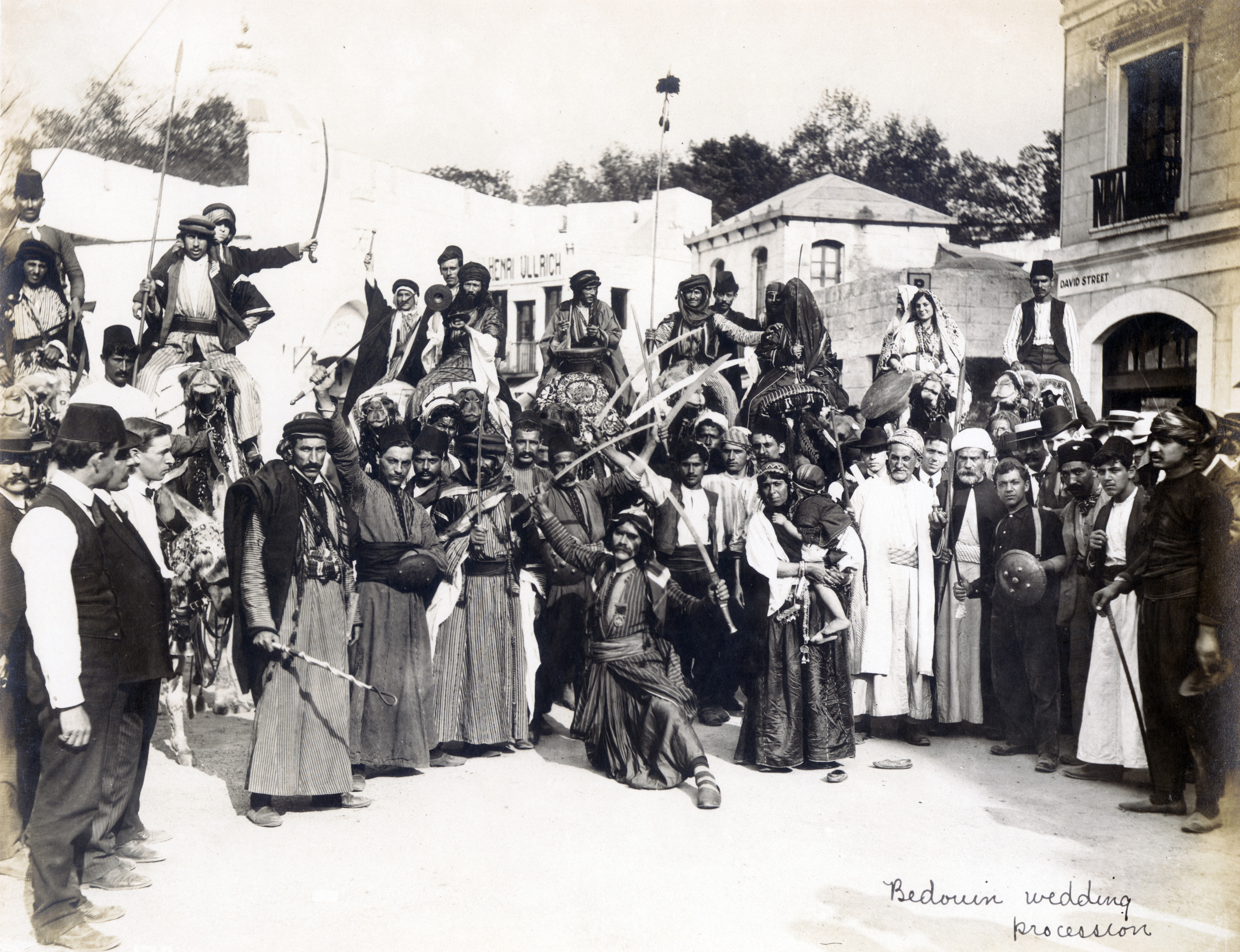
Bedouin wedding procession in the Jerusalem section of the pike at the 1904 World's Fair.

The Bedouin who remained in the Negev belonged to the Tiaha confederation as well as some smaller groups such as the 'Azazme and the Jahalin. After 1948, some Negev Bedouins were displaced. The Jahalin tribe, for instance, lived in the Tel Arad region of the Negev prior to the 1950s. In the early 1950s, the Jahalin were among the tribes that, according to Emanuel Marx, "moved or were removed by the military government". They ended up in the so-called E1 area East of Jerusalem. Famously, Bedouin shepherds were the first to discover the Dead Sea Scrolls, a collection of Jewish texts from antiquity, in the Judean caves of Qumran in 1946. Of great religious, cultural, historical and linguistic significance, 972 texts were found over the following decade, many of which were discovered by Bedouins.

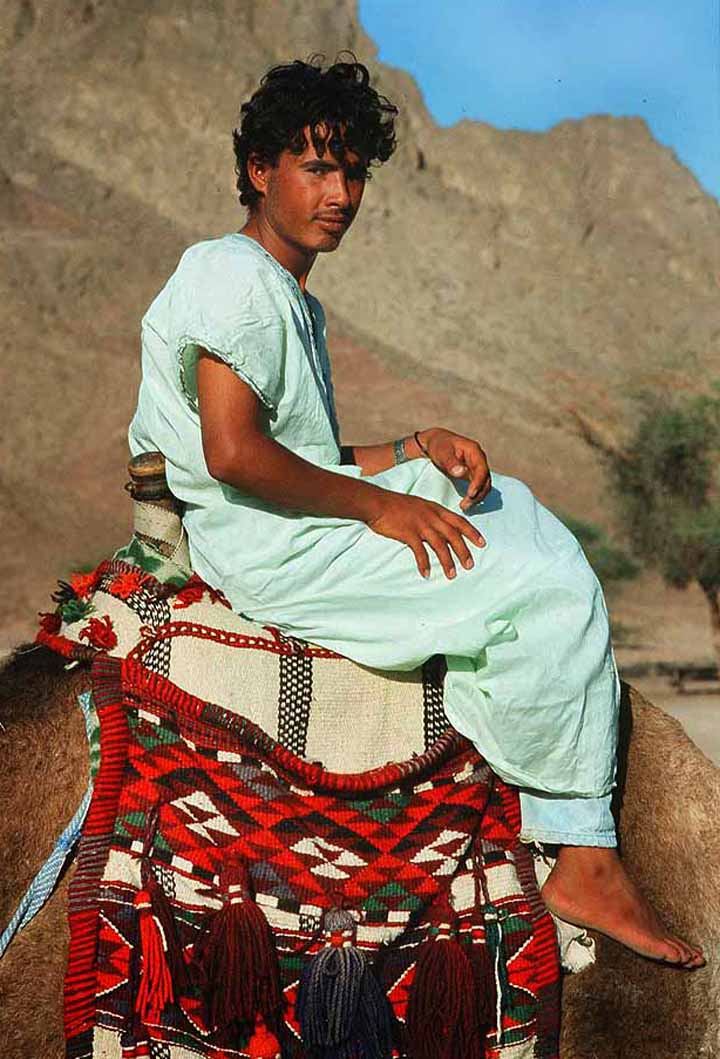
A Negev Bedouin man.

In September 2011, the Israeli government approved a five-year economic development plan called the Prawer plan. One of its implications is a relocation of some 30,000-40,000 Negev Bedouin from areas not recognized by the government to government-approved townships. In a 2012 resolution the European Parliament called for the withdrawal of the Prawer plan and respect for the rights of the Bedouin people. In September 2014, Yair Shamir, who heads the Israeli government's ministerial committee on Bedouin resettlement arrangements, stated that the government was examining ways to lower the birthrate of the Bedouin community in order to improve its standard of living. Shamir claimed that without intervention, the population could exceed half a million by 2035.

In May 2015, the United Nations Office for the Coordination of Humanitarian Affairs and the United Nations Relief and Works Agency for Palestine Refugees have combined forces. Both organizations called on Israel to stop its plans to relocate Bedouin communities currently living in the West Bank to land outside of Jerusalem for better access to infrastructure, health, and education. Officials stated that a "forcible transfer" of over 7000 Bedouin would "destroy their culture and livelihoods."

=== Jordan ===
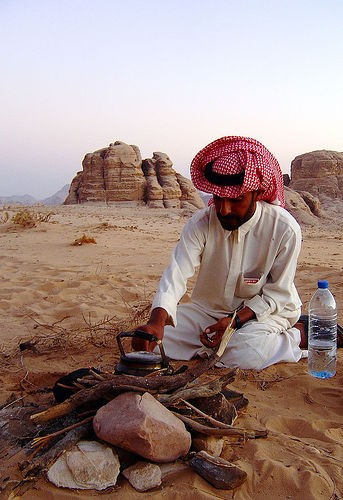
A young Bedouin lighting a camp fire in Wadi Rum, Jordan

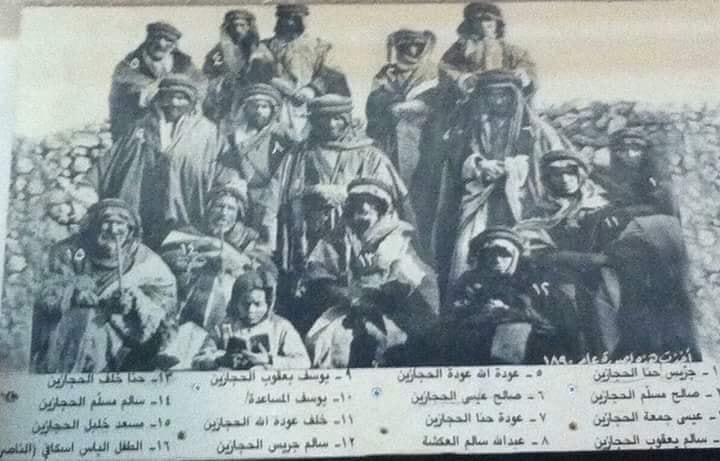
A significant percentage of Jordanian Christians are ethnically Bedouin. The picture shows a Bedouin Christian family belonging to the Hijazeen tribe in Karak in 1895

Most of the Bedouin tribes migrated from the Arabian Peninsula to what is Jordan today between the 14th and 18th centuries. They are often referred to as a backbone of the Kingdom, since Bedouin clans traditionally support the monarchy.

Most of Jordan's Bedouin live in the vast wasteland that extends east from the Desert Highway. The eastern Bedouin are camel breeders and herders, while the western Bedouin herd sheep and goats. Some Bedouin in Jordan are semi-nomads: they adopt a nomadic existence during part of the year but return to their lands and homes in time to practice agriculture.

The largest nomadic groups of Jordan are the Bani Hasan (Mafraq, Zarqa, Jarash, Ajloun and parts of Amman) Bani Sakher (Amman and Madaba) Banū Laith (Petra), and Howeitat (they reside in Wadi Rum). There are numerous lesser groups, such as the al-Sirḥān, Banū Khālid, Hawazim, ʿAṭiyyah, and Sharafāt. The Ruwālah (Rwala) tribe, which is not indigenous, passes through Jordan in its yearly wandering from Syria to Saudi Arabia. The region encompassing Wadi Musa and Petra is inhabited by the prominent Liyathnah tribe alongside the smaller Bedul community, believed to have Jewish or Nabataean ancestry. The Hijazeen are a Christian Bedouin tribe located in Jordan with roots in the Hejaz of present-day Saudi Arabia.

The Jordanian government provides the Bedouin with different services such as education, housing and health clinics. However, some Bedouins give it up and prefer their traditional nomadic lifestyle.

In the recent years, there is a growing discontent of the Bedouin with the ruling monarch Abdullah II of Jordan. In August 2007, police clashed with some 200 Bedouins who were blocking the main highway between Amman and the port of Aqaba. Livestock herders were protesting the government's lack of support in the face of the steeply rising cost of animal feed and expressed resentment about government assistance to refugees.

Arab Spring events in 2011 led to demonstrations in Jordan, and Bedouins took part in them. But the Hashemites did not see a revolt similar to turbulence in other Arab states. The main reasons for that are the high respect to the monarch and contradictory interests of different groups of the Jordanian society. The King Abdullah II maintains his distance from the complaints by allowing blame to fall on government ministers, whom he replaces at will.

=== Egypt ===
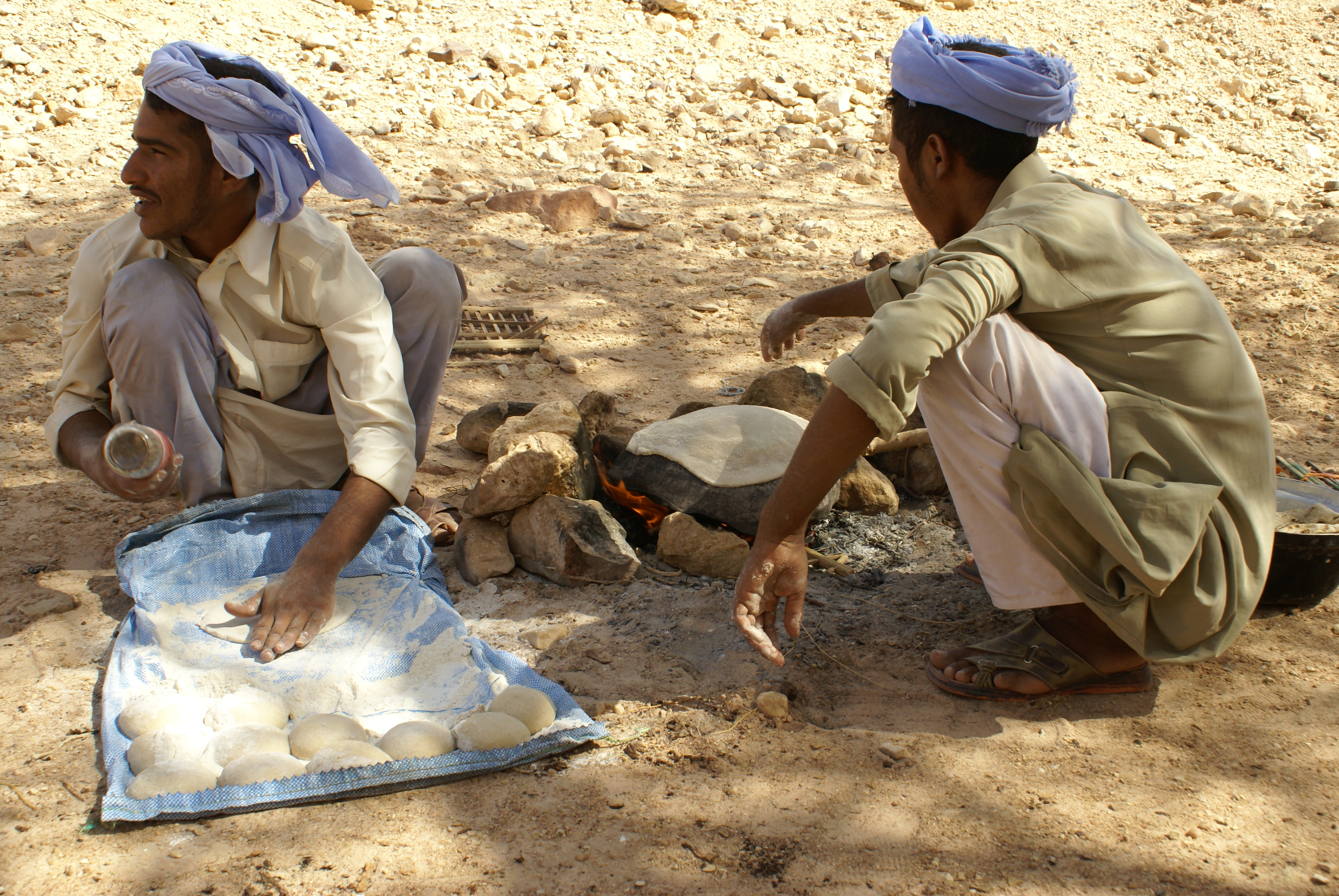
Bedouins making bread in Egypt.

Bedouins in Egypt mostly reside in the Sinai Peninsula, Matruh, Red Sea governate, eastern parts of Sharqia governate, Suez, Ismailia and in the suburbs of the Egyptian capital of Cairo. Traditional Bedouin culture was affected by the establishment of resort towns on the Red Sea coast, such as Sharm el-Sheikh. In the wake of urbanization and educational opportunities, many Bedouins now marry outside their tribe, a practice that once was frowned upon.

Bedouins living in the Sinai Peninsula did not benefit much from the construction boom due to the low wages offered. Sudanese and Egyptian workers were brought in as construction workers instead. When the tourist industry started to bloom, local Bedouins became cab drivers, tour guides and managers of campgrounds and coffee shops. Tarabin and other Bedouin tribes living along the border between Egypt and Israel have been involved in inter-border smuggling of drugs and weapons, as well as infiltration of prostitutes and African labourers.

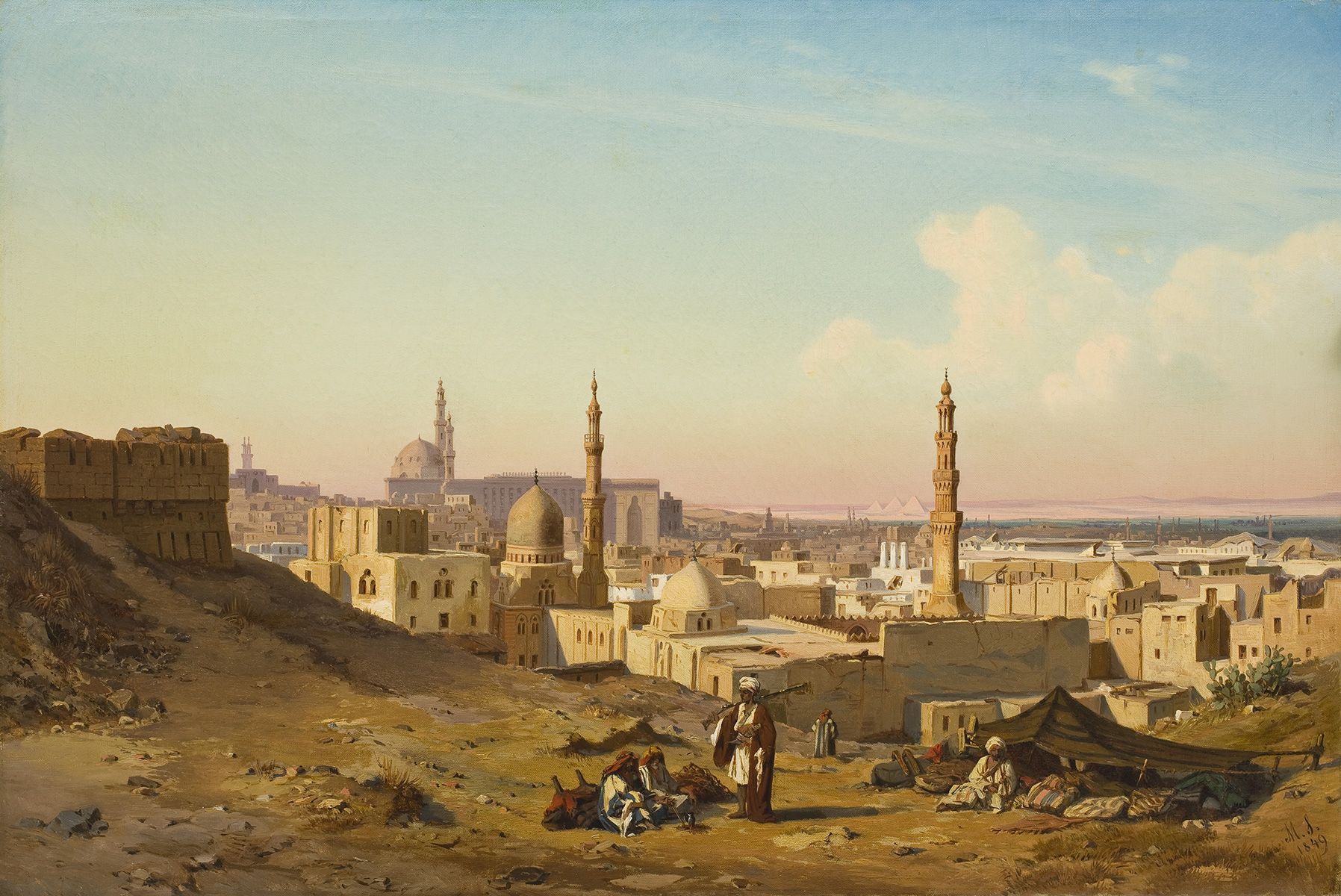
Bedouin encampment outside Cairo, 1849

In most countries in the Middle East, the Bedouin have no land rights, only users' privileges, and it is especially true for Egypt. Since the mid-1980s, Bedouins who held desirable coastal property have lost control of much of their land, which was sold by the Egyptian government to hotel operators. The Egyptian government did not see the land as belonging to Bedouin tribes, but rather as state property.

In the summer of 1999, the Egyptian army bulldozed Bedouin-run tourist campgrounds north of Nuweiba as part of the final phase of hotel development overseen by the Tourist Development Agency (TDA). The director of the TDA dismissed Bedouin rights to most of the land, saying that they had not lived on the coast prior to 1982. Their traditional semi-nomadic culture has left Bedouins vulnerable to such claims.

The Egyptian Revolution of 2011 brought more freedom to the Sinai Bedouin, but since they were involved in drug smuggling into Gaza, the Egyptian army demolished over 120 tunnels used as smuggling channels, compelling them to cooperate with state troops and officials. After negotiations, the military campaign ended with a new agreement between the Bedouin and Egyptian authorities.

=== Maghreb ===
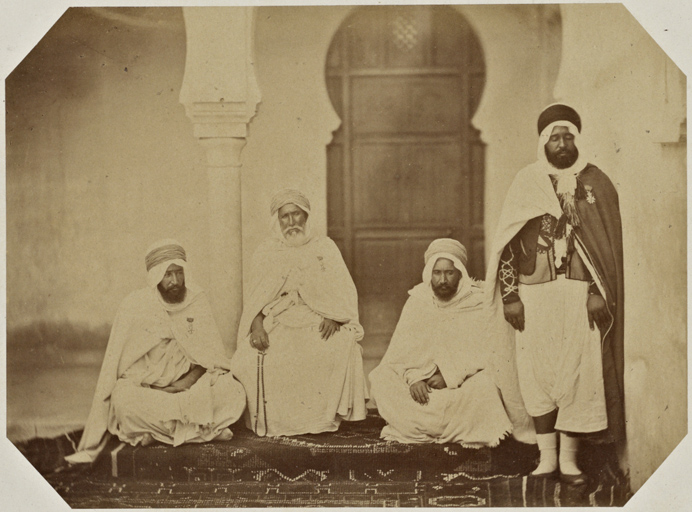
Commander and Amir of Mascara in Algeria, Banu Hilal.

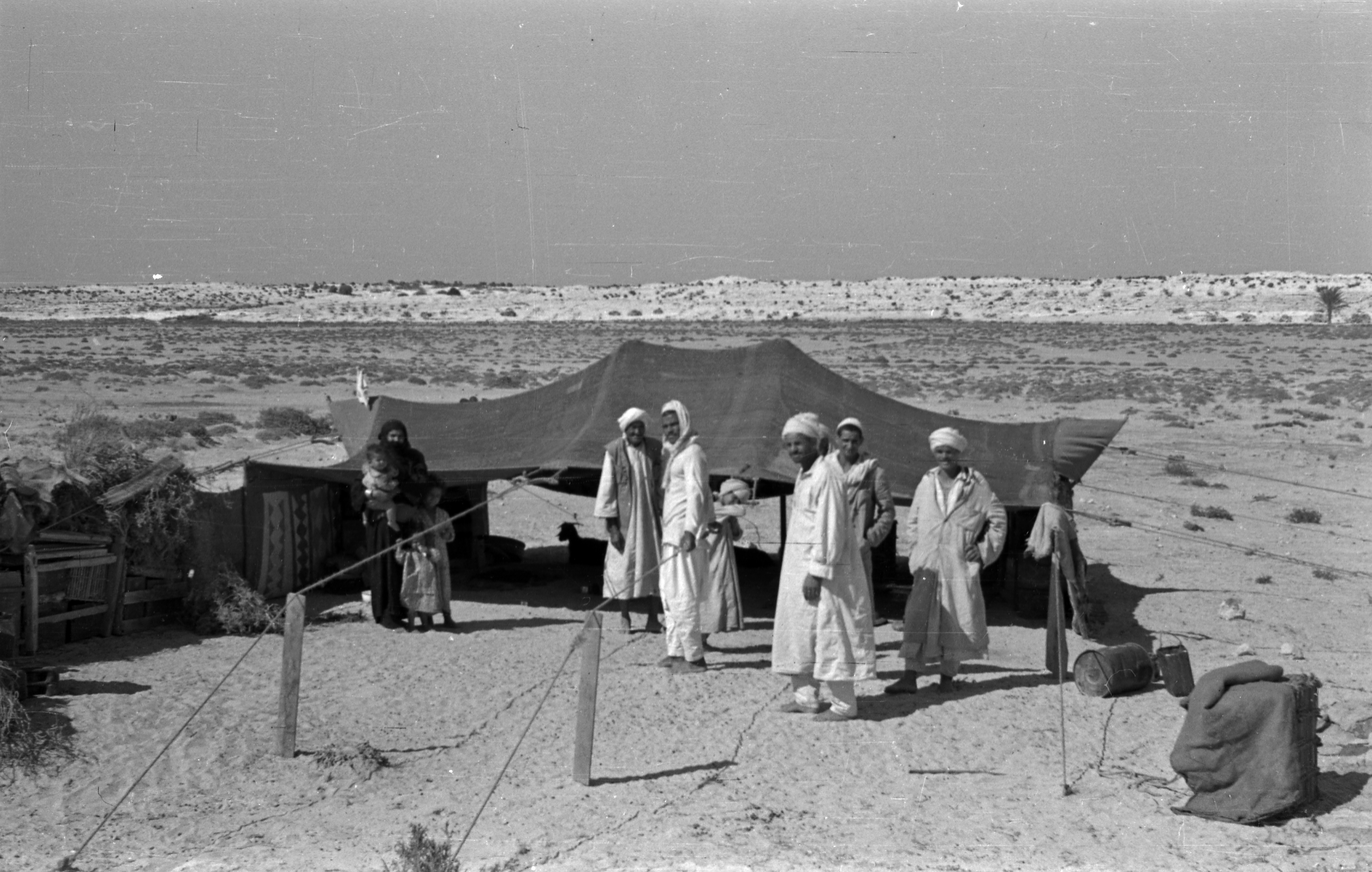
A group of Bedouins with their tent in Libya, 1950s

The Arab migration to the Maghreb had been a centuries-long process that continuously occurred since the 7th century. The initial waves of migration from the 7th to the 10th centuries mostly involved sedentary Arabs who established communities in cities, towns and surrounding rural areas. However, the Arab migrations from the 11th to the 15th centuries involved a significant influx of a great amount of nomadic Bedouin tribes to the region.

In the 11th century, the Bedouin tribes of Banu Hilal and Banu Sulaym, who originated from central and north Arabia respectively, living at the time in a desert between the Nile and the Red Sea, moved westward into the Maghreb areas and were joined by the Bedouin tribe of Ma'qil, which had its roots in South Arabia, as well as other Arab tribes.

The 11th century witnessed the most significant wave of Arab migration, surpassing all previous movements. This event unfolded when the Zirid dynasty of Ifriqiya proclaimed its independence from the Fatimid Caliphate of Egypt. In retribution against the Zirids, the Fatimids dispatched large Bedouin Arab tribes, mainly the Banu Hilal and Banu Sulaym, to defeat the Zirids and settle in the Maghreb. These tribes followed a nomadic lifestyle and were originally from the Hejaz and Najd. They were later joined by the Bedouin tribe of Ma'qil, which had its roots in South Arabia, as well as other Arab tribes.

According to Ibn Khaldun, they were accompanied by their wives, children and stock. They settled in the Maghreb after repeatedly fighting battles against the Berbers, such as the Battle of Haydaran. They heavily transformed the culture of the Maghreb into Arab culture, and spread nomadism in areas where agriculture was previously dominant. It played a major role in spreading Bedouin Arabic to rural areas such as the countryside and steppes, and as far as the southern areas near the Sahara. In addition, they destroyed the Berber Zirid state and most of its cities, sparing only the Mediterranean coastal strip at Mahdia, and deeply weakened the neighboring Hammadid dynasty and the Zenata. Their influx was a major factor in the linguistic, cultural, genetic and ethnic Arabization of the Maghreb. According to Ibn Khaldun, the lands ravaged by Banu Hilal invaders had become desertified and turned into completely arid desert. The journey of Banu Hilal is recounted in the Arabic oral poem of Sirat Bani Hilal.

To persuade the Banu Hilal and Banu Sulaym to migrate to the Maghreb, the Fatimid caliph gave each tribesman a camel and money and helped them cross from the east to the west bank of the Nile. The severe drought in Egypt at the time also persuaded these tribes to migrate to the Maghreb, which had a better economic situation at the time. The Fatimid caliph instructed them to rule the Maghreb instead of the Zirid emir Al-Mu'izz and told them "I have given you the Maghrib and the rule of al-Mu'izz ibn Balkīn as-Sanhājī the runaway slave. You will want for nothing." and told Al-Mu'izz "I have sent you horses and put brave men on them so that God might accomplish a matter already enacted".

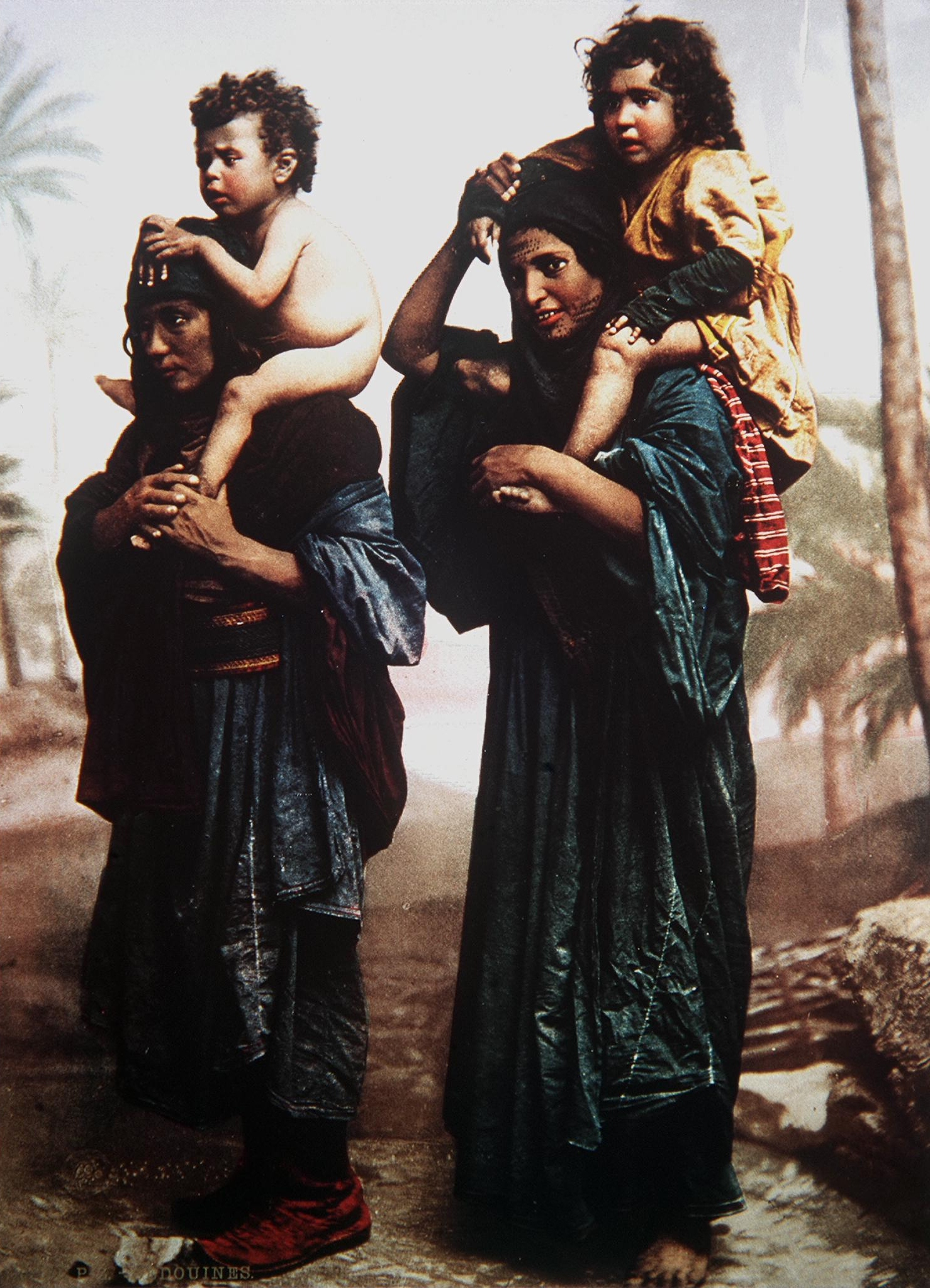
Bedouin mothers carrying their children on their shoulders. Hand-coloured print of a late 19th century black-and-white photo by French photographer Félix Bonfils.

Berber armies were defeated in trying to protect the walls of Kairouan. The Zirids abandoned Kairouan to take refuge on the coast where they survived for a century. Ifriqiya, the Banu Hilal and Banu Sulaym spread is on the high plains of Constantine where they gradually choked the Qal'a of Banu Hammad, as they had done Kairouan few decades ago. From there, they gradually gained the upper Algiers and Oran plains, some were taken to the Moulouya valley and in Doukkala plains by the Caliph of Marrakesh in the second half of the 12th century. Ibn Khaldun, a Muslim historian wrote: "Similar to an army of locusts, they destroy everything in their path." As Arab nomads spread, the territories of the local Berber tribes were moved and shrank. The Zenata were pushed to the west and the Kabyles were pushed to the north. The Berbers took refuge in the mountains whereas the plains were Arabized. The arrival of the Banu Hilal, followed by the Banu Sulaym in the 12th century, broke the balance between nomads and sedentary populations in favor of the nomads. For strategic reasons, the Almohads gave over the Atlantic plains of the western Maghreb to them.

Sources estimated that the total number of Arab nomads who migrated to the Maghreb only in the 11th century was at around 1 million Arabs.

The Ma'qilis also entered the Maghreb during this wave of Arabian tribal immigration in the 11th century. They later allied with the Banu Hilal and entered under their protection. They adapted to the climatic desert conditions of the Maghreb, discovering the same way of life as in the Arabian Peninsula. In the 13th century, they occupied southern Algeria and dominated the oases of Tuat and Gourara. For some authors, at this point, the Maqil group had already disintegrated into different populations in the Maghreb and had given rise to the Beni Ḥassān along with other related groups. The Beni Hassan expanded southwest and occupied Sanhaja lands in the 13th century after invading and defeating the Berber confederation. The Sanhaja has long had to pay tribute to the nomadic Bedouin Hassani invaders. This took place during the Char Bouba war in modern-day Western Sahara and Mauritania from 1644 to 1674, which after decades of confrontations ended up completely Arabizing the native Berber population, destroying their language and culture and giving rise to the contemporary Sahrawi people. Harry Norris noted "the Moorish Sahara is the western extremity of the Arab World. Western it certainly is, some districts further west than Ireland, yet in its way of life, its culture, its literature and in many of its social customs, it has much in common with the heart lands of the Arab East, in particular with the Hijaz and Najd and parts of the Yemen".

These Bedouin tribes emerged into several contemporary sub-tribes. The most well known Bedouin tribes in Algeria include Awlad Sidi Shaykh, Ouled Naïl, Chaamba, Doui-Menia and Hamyan, who primarily live in the Algerian Desert.

The Maghrebi Bedouin dialects, often called Hilalian dialects, are used in the regions of Morocco Atlantic coast, in regions of High Plains and Sahara in Algeria, in regions of Tunisian Sahel and in regions of Tripolitania. The Bedouin dialects has four major varieties:

- Sulaym dialects, Libya and southern Tunisia;
- Eastern Hilal dialects, central Tunisia and eastern Algeria;
- Central Hilal dialects, south and central Algeria, especially in border areas of Sahara;
- Western Hilal dialects, Atlantic plains of western Morocco
- Maqil dialects, western Algeria and Morocco;

In Morocco, Bedouin Arabic dialects are spoken in plains and in recently founded cities such as Casablanca. Thus, the city Arabic dialect shares with the Bedouin dialects gal 'to say' (qala); they also represent the bulk of modern urban dialects (Koinés), such as those of Oran and Algiers.

== Tribes and populations ==
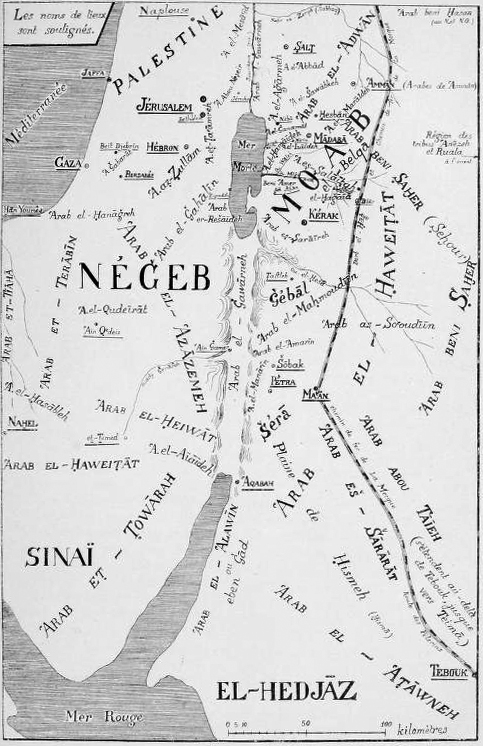
Map of the Bedouin tribes in 1908

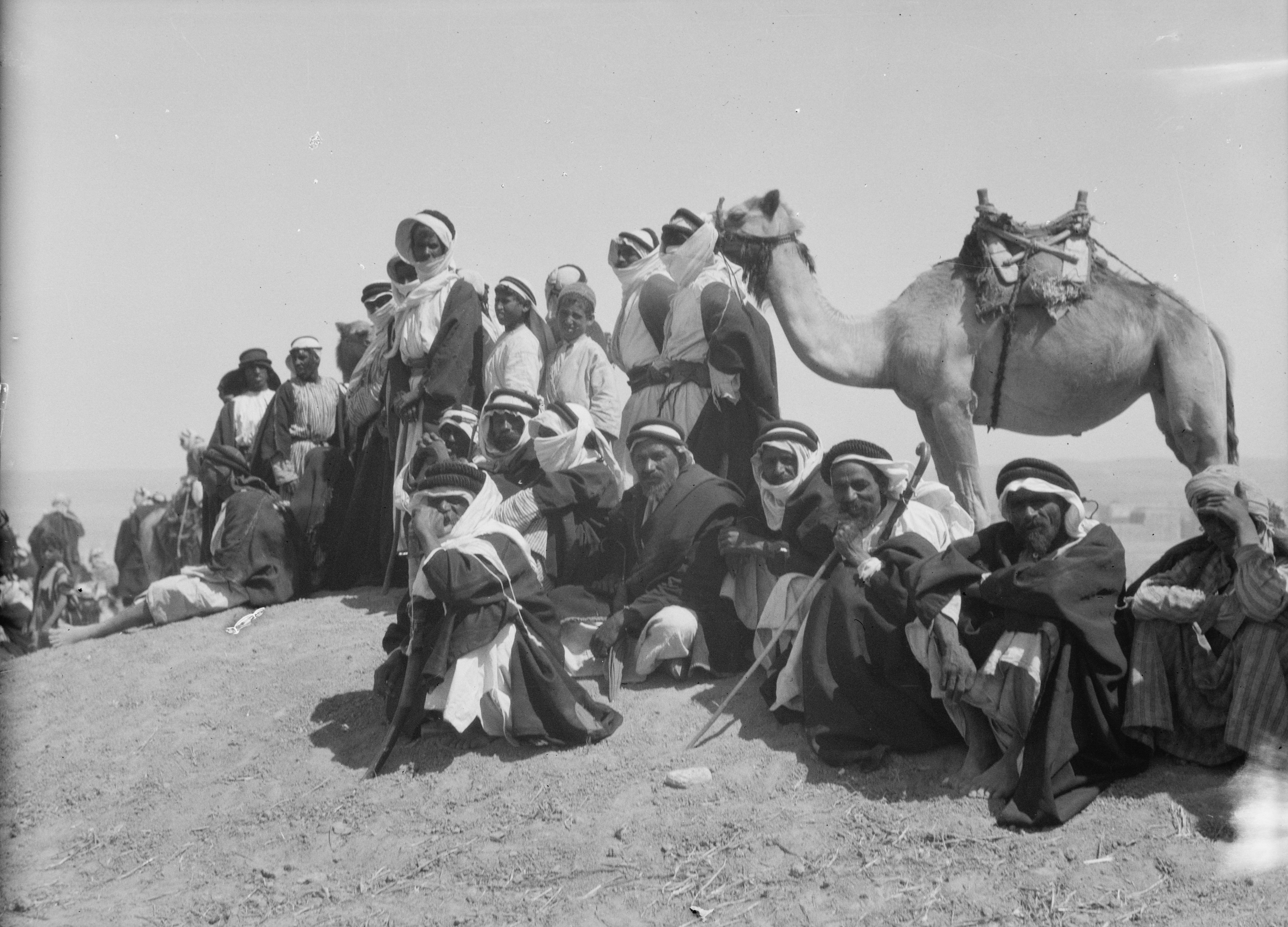
Bedouins racing and feasting at Beersheba in 1930

There are a number of Bedouin tribes, but the total population is difficult to determine, as many Bedouin have ceased to lead nomadic or semi-nomadic lifestyles. Below is a partial list of Bedouin tribes and their historic place of origin.

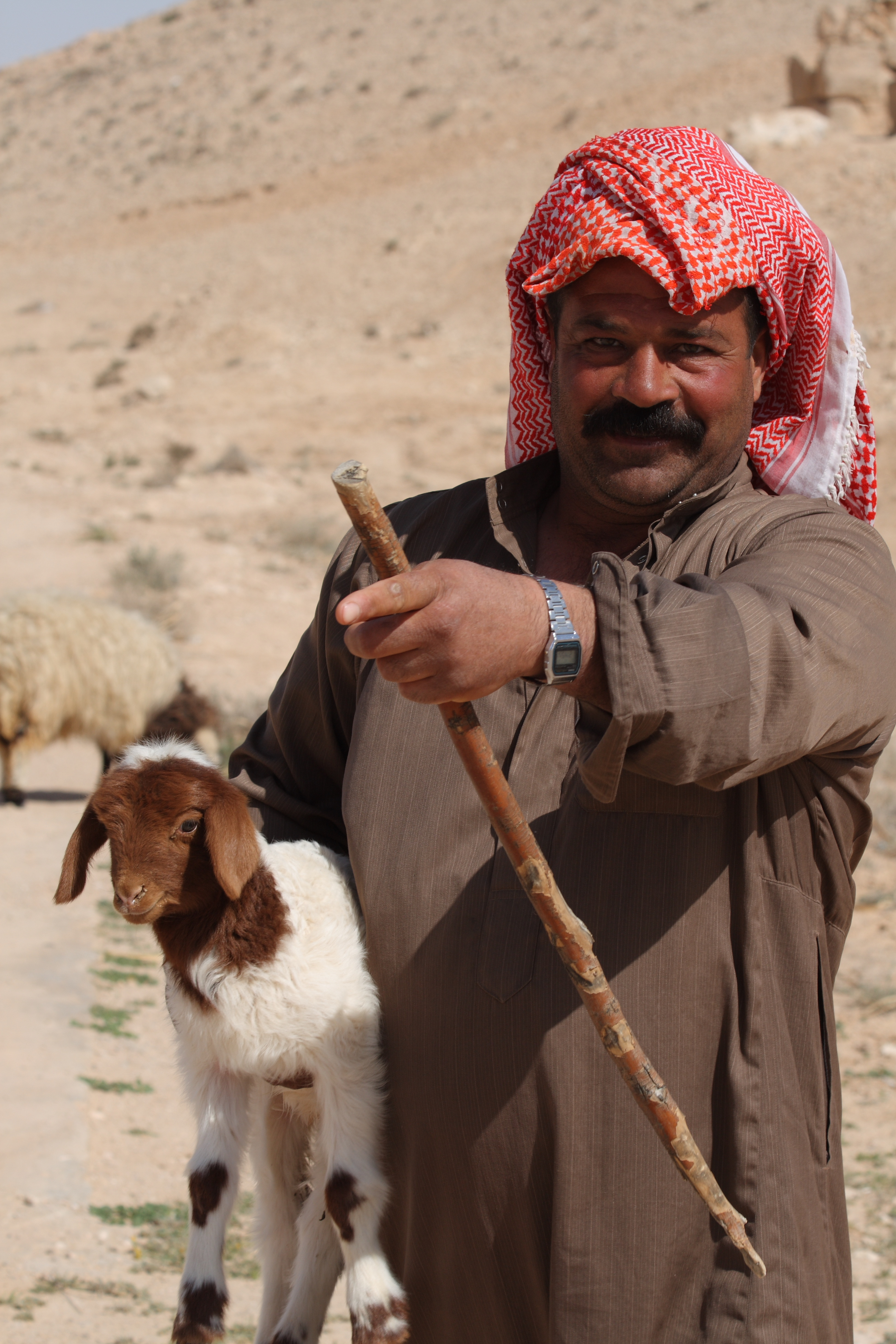
Bedouin shepherd in Syrian Desert

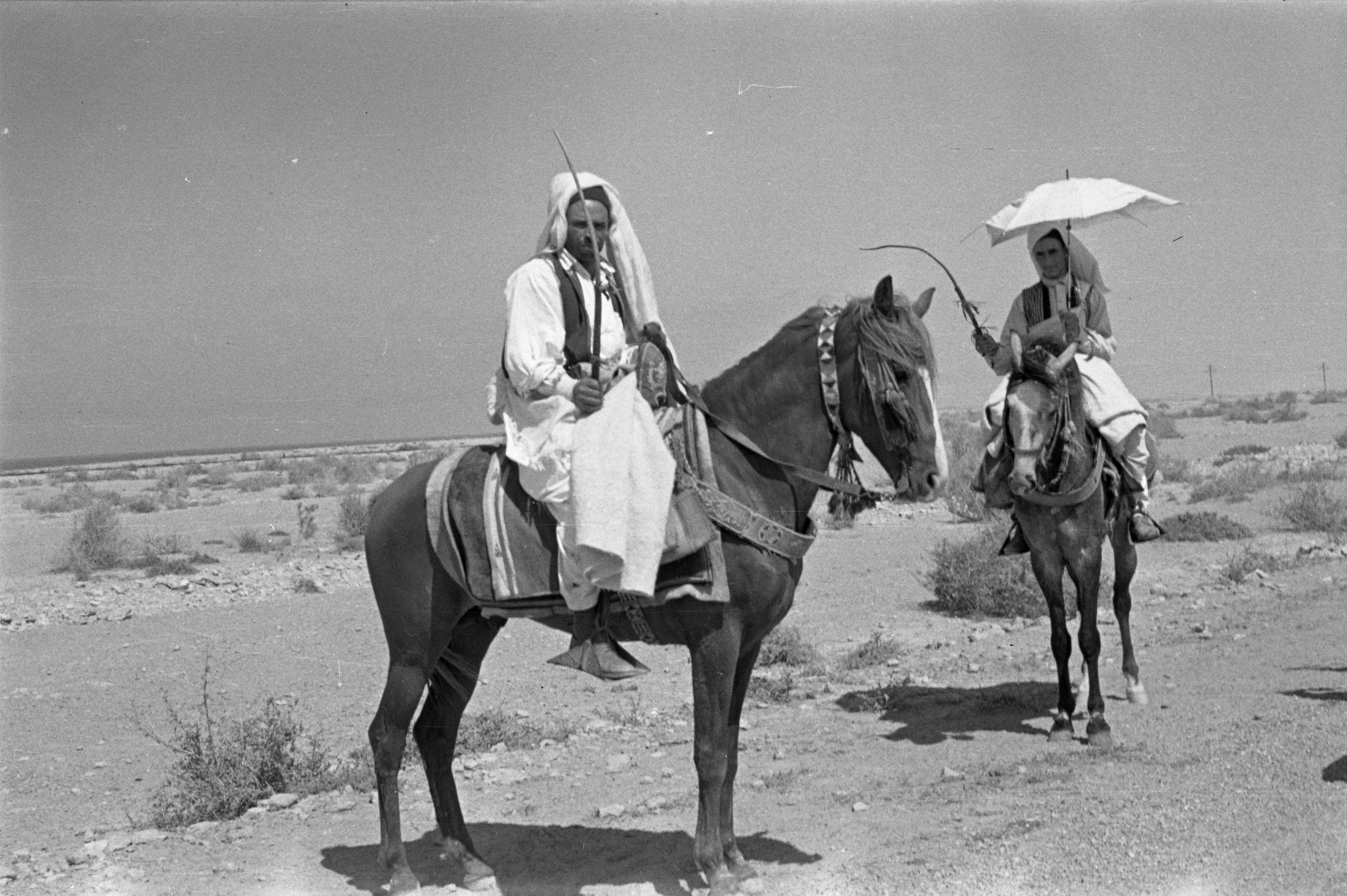
Bedouins on horseback, 1950s

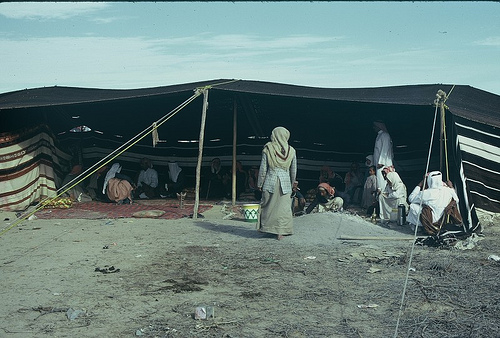
Bedouin camp in Saudi Arabia in the 1970s

- Otaibah, located in Najd and Hijaz, found mainly in the Arabian Peninsula in Saudi Arabia, Qatar, Bahrain, Kuwait, and the United Arab Emirates.
- Harb, located in the Arabian Peninsula.
- Beni Sakher, located in Jordan, Egypt, Syria, and Iraq. Families in the tribe such as the Al-Fayez, Al-Zaben, Al Hgeish, Al-Jboor, and the Al-Khreisheh represent the tribe in Jordan and wield significant political power in the country after the Hashemites. There are other families that are smaller in size including Al-Mteirat, Al-Hamed, Al-Badarin, and Al-Othman.
- Banu Hilal, located in Saudi Arabia, Morocco, Algeria, Tunisia and Libya. The tribe originated in Najd, but migrated in the 11th century to North Africa in what is famously known as Taghribat Bani Hilal.
- Banu Sulaym, located in Libya, Tunisia, Algeria, Morocco and Syria.
- 'Anizzah, some of the clans of this tribe are Bedouins, they live in northern Saudi Arabia, western Iraq, the Gulf states, Syrian steppe and in Bekaa.
- 'Azazima, Negev desert and Egypt.
- Beni Hamida, east of Dead Sea, Jordan.
- Banu Yam centered in Najran Province, Saudi Arabia and Iraq and is divided into Bedouins and urban
- Al Bu Shamis (Tribe), Buraimi, Sultanate Of Oman - Al Ain City, Abu Dhabi, UAE
- Na'im (Tribe), Buraimi, Sultanate Of Oman - Al Ain City, Abu Dhabi, UAE
- Nu'aym (Tribe), southern and central Syria, particularly Golan Heights, Hauran and Homs
- Balush (Tribe), Buraimi, Sultanate Of Oman - Al Ain City, Abu Dhabi, UAE
- Bani Qitab (Tribe), Buraimi, Sultanate Of Oman - Al Ain City, Abu Dhabi, UAE
- Bani Kaab (Tribe), Buraimi, Sultanate Of Oman - Al Ain City, Abu Dhabi, UAE
- Khawatir (Tribe), Buraimi, Sultanate Of Oman - Al Ain City, Abu Dhabi, UAE
- Ghafalah (Tribe), Buraimi, Sultanate Of Oman - Al Ain City, Abu Dhabi, UAE
- Dulaim, a very large and powerful tribe in Al Anbar, Western Iraq.
- al-Amad (alAmad, Al Amad, Al-Amad family) of al-Umdah clan ("The Mayors Tribe"), one of the smaller yet prominent tribes of the Arabian Peninsula. Mostly scattered across Iraq, Jordan, Kuwait, Saudi Arabia, Oman, Palestine and United Arab Emirates. This tribe is also associated with Samaritan ancestry (Samaritans).
- al-Abadi "Abadi clan" mostly based in Jordan. Very well respected across the country with influential positions in the Army and national services.
- al-Duwasir, also known as al-Dousari located in central Saudi Arabia, especially Wadi Al-Dawasir, as well as Eastern Arabia in the Eastern Province of Saudi Arabia, Bahrain, Kuwait, and Qatar.
- Ghamid, large tribe from Al-Bahah Province, Saudi Arabia, mostly settled, but with a small Bedouin section known as Badiyat Ghamid.
- al-Hadid, large Bedouin tribe found in Iraq, Syria and Jordan. Now mostly are settled in cities such as Haditha in Iraq, Homs & Hama in Syria, and Amman in Jordan.
- al-Howeitat, one of the largest tribes in Jordan, northern Saudi Arabia, and eastern Egypt. That descends from Judham, an ancient north Arabian Qahtanite tribe.
- Qahtan, one of the largest tribes in the Arabian Peninsula. The Bedouin portion of the tribe roamed an area extended from the South of Najd to the Southwest of Saudi Arabia.
- Al-Dhafeer in Northeast Saudi Arabia, Southern Iraq, and Kuwait.
- Mawali, central and northern Syria
- Mutayr in Central and Eastern Saudi Arabia.
- Bani Khalid, some of its clans are Bedouins in Eastern Saudi Arabia, Kuwait, Qatar, Jordan, Egypt and Syria.
- Bani 'Uqbah, large Bedouin tribe in the Arabian Peninsula, the Southern Levant, Egypt, and parts of Iraq, descending from Judham, an ancient north Arabian Qahtanite tribe.
- Al Murrah are one of the largest and powerful tribes of the Arabian Peninsula covering Southeastern Saudi Arabia, Qatar and United Arab Emirates. The tribe historically roamed the Empty Quarter desert.
- Ajman of Eastern Saudi Arabia.
- al-Mawasi, a group living on the central Gaza Strip coast.
- Ma'qil, a Bedouin tribe of Yemeni origin, located in Morocco, Western Sahara, Mauritania, and west Algeria.
- Muzziena tribe in Dahab and South Sinai (Egypt).
- Shahran (al-Ariydhah), a very large tribe residing in the area between Bisha, Khamis Mushait and Abha. Al-Arydhah 'wide' is a famous name for Shahran because it has a very large area, in Saudi Arabia.
- Shammar, a very large and influential tribe. The Bedouins of this tribe live in Iraq, northern Saudi Arabia, Syria and Jordan. Descended from the ancient tribe of Tayy from Najd.
- Subay', Some of the clans of this tribe are bedouins and live in the far south of the Najd region.
- Tarabin—one of the largest tribes in Egypt (Sinai) and Israel (Negev).
- Tuba-Zangariyye, Israel near the Jordan river cliff in the Eastern Galilee.
- Al Wahiba, a large tribe in Oman residing in the Sharqiya Sands, also known as the Wahiba Sands
- Al Rashaida is originally a tribe from the Hejaz, but large portions of it have migrated to Eritrea and Eastern Sudan. Although bedouins from other tribes have migrated with them as well, the name has come to refer to all of them.

== See also ==
- Arab (etymology)
- Ardah
- Bedawi Arabic
- Ghinnawa
- Qedarites
- Koheilan
- Tribes of Arabia
- Tribes of Yemen
- Jaghbub
- Bedoon, stateless people in some Middle Eastern countries
- Faz'ah
