= Mzeina Bedouin =

Bedouin tribe in Sinai Peninsula

Mzeina Bedouin (also spelled Muzzeina and Muzeina) are a Arab Bedouin tribe in the southern Sinai Peninsula. It is the largest group of Bedouin people in Sinai.

The town of Dahab is home to one of the largest populations of Mzeina in Sinai, Bedouin people have lived in this town (once a small oasis and fishing village) for over 800 years. The Bedouin people in Sinai today face similar challenges to their neighbours throughout the Middle East. Their way of life has changed much and they are losing much of their cultural heritage.
