= Witchcraft: Its Power in the World Today =

1940 book by William Buehler Seabrook

- Author: William Buehler Seabrook
- Language: English
- Publisher: Harcourt Brace & Company
- Publication date: 1940
- Publication place: United States
- ISBN: 4871872440

Witchcraft: Its Power in the World Today is a book by William Buehler Seabrook which was published in 1940. It details the author's views on psychology, parapsychology and the occult, and contains information about the author's meetings with a number of famous people.

Throughout his writing career, Seabrook had been fascinated with the strange, from Dervish mystics (Adventures in Arabia) to Haitian zombies (Magic Island). Witchcraft contains Seabrook’s look back at his earlier first-hand experiences. He writes in the foreword that the book will be "a disappointment to all who believe in the supernatural." He concludes that although he had searched the world for the supernatural, on reflection he had to infer that he had seen nothing inexplicable by science. Nevertheless, he remained fascinated by the possibilities of human psychology and parapsychology.

The book is divided into four sections, including a long appendix.

== Part One: The Witch and the Doll ==
This section contains anecdotes concerning the use of voodoo dolls (more properly, poppets) to cause illness and death, with examples taken from the Ivory Coast, France, and the UK. The author is of the opinion that the dolls work through the power of suggestion, and that even in cases of conscious scepticism unconscious belief might have an effect. The author also wrote that he had trained as a witchdoctor in a Malinke town near Bassam.

The section also includes the claim that Seabrook's ancestor, Bishop Peter Boehler, had been a practitioner of black magic.

== Part Two: The Vampire and the Werewolf ==
Section two reviews the case of Countess Elizabeth Bathory, a noblewoman accused of murder and sadistic practices.

It also recounts the case of a woman known to Seabrook who felt an urge to drink blood due to pernicious anaemia, and a couple of incidents from Africa that showed a belief in humans turning into animals. He also recounts an incident involving his friend, an occultist named John Bannister, who helped a young Russian woman who had memories of being a wolf.

== Part Three: White Magic, Professor Rhine, the Supernormal, and Justine ==
In this section, the author puts forward his theory that sense deprivation may encourage psychic abilities, and he criticises the work of parapsychologist J.B. Rhine for failing to consider this. While Seabrook was generally sceptical of such abilities, he was perplexed by some incidents he recorded, and suggests that the theories about time and space of Albert Einstein might hold the answer to some of these mysteries.

The anecdotes in this section include the author's own experience of navigating a boat while in a kind of trance due to extreme tiredness, which he compares with the practices of Melewi Dervishes, whom he said that he studied under in Syria.

Seabrook then goes on to recount a meeting with G.I. Gurdjieff, and to describe the dances performed by his followers. Seabrook claims that Gurdjieff asked him to invite some his friends to Gurdjieff's apartment, where Gurdjieff gave a reading from his manuscript Beelezbub's Tale. Apparently the listeners (who included the behaviourist John Watson, Lincoln Steffens, and George Seldes) were perplexed and unimpressed; Seabrook notes that the book did not have a publisher (although it was later published under as Beelzebub's Tales to his Grandson).

This is followed by a sympathetic account of Aleister Crowley and Seabrook's encounters with him.

The final chapters discuss Upton Sinclair and his book Mental Radio, and an incidence of biographer William Woodward debunking someone who claimed to have a supernatural power. This is followed by an account of Seabrook's experiments in sense deprivation involving his lover Justine. The experiments include the use of a specially made mask, which Seabrook notes was considered to have "psycho-erotic" elements by Michel Leiris. Seabrook claims that the experiments led to results suggestive of precognition.

== Part Four: Appendix ==
The Appendix contains extra anecdotes and references, often taken from newspaper reports. There are also long quotes taken from Elliott O'Donnell's Strange Cults and Secret Societies of Modern London (describing a "panther-cult"), John Mulholland's Beware Familiar Spirits (describing his investigation of chance by using a randomising process developed by IBM, in order to criticise Rhine), and Peter Freuchen's Arctic Adventure, which describes the mystical practices of Eskimos.

The appendix also includes discussion of Jiddu Krishnamurti, yogi Pierre Bernard, Nostradamus (apparently before he was well known in the US), Spiritualist Bishop Arthur Ford, and Ignatius Trebitsch.

== Critical reception ==
The publication was widely reviewed. Time called it a "mildly entertaining potful of scraps." Newsweek was more complimentary, saying that the book was "... no doubt a valuable contribution to the science of this peculiar subject." The New York Times Book Review wrote: "These personal experiences of the author are especially interesting parts of an interesting book."

The book was used as a source for the 1972 novel Daughter of Darkness, about a young woman who uses African sympathetic magic and poppets to control her family and environment.

== Bibliography ==
Original Publication:

- Seabrook, William (1940). Witchcraft. New York: Harcourt Brace & Company., ISBN 4871872440

Most Recent Publication:

- Seabrook, William (2000). Witchcraft. Scientist of New Atlantis. ISBN 1-57179-246-5, ISBN 978-1-57179-246-4.
