= Bedul =

Bedouin tribe in Jordan

Bdul/Bdoul

Total population
- 1000-1500 (2010)

Regions with significant populations
- Jordan

Languages
- Jordanian Arabic

Religion
- Islam

Related ethnic groups
- Other Arabs

The Bedul (also known as Bdul, Bdoul) are an indigenous Jordanian Bedouin tribe based primarily in Wadi Musa and other surrounding areas of Petra. The Jordanian government has in multiple instances forcibly displaced Bedul from their native homes, firstly in 1985 and in the current wave beginning in 2024. After this forced displacement many now live in Umm Seyhoun near Wadi Musa.

The Bedul traditionally farm cattle and also conduct agriculture of wheat and barley. They have also been called the "natural guardians of Petra", and variations, and continue to use the ancient cisterns and caves near Petra.

Alongside the Bedul's own indigenous tradition, several alternative origin theories were documented, based on the Bedul's own oral traditions and on research. They include descent from a pre-Islamic Jewish population, direct descent from the Nabataeans, Gypsy (Roma) origin, or simple derivation as an offshoot of the larger Huwaytat confederacy. According to one source, the Bedul number about a thousand people, however according to the Jordanian government they number about 1500.

== History ==
=== Late Ottoman period ===
In 1894 Sheikh 'Arar ibn Jazi led a revolt against expanding Turkish authority, resulting in the deaths of several soldiers. But in 1895 he had to flee north alongside his followers. he was subsequently imprisoned at Damascus. During the Arab revolt the Liyathna noted that the Bedul were an impoverished people, likely as a result of the events of the late 1800s.

=== 1920-1980 ===
in the late 1920s and 1930s, soldiers were posted at Petra due to ongoing fighting between the Bedul and their neighbor, the Liyathna.

=== 1980-present ===
In 1985 Petra was designated a World Heritage Site by UNESCO and most of the tribe—numbering roughly 140 families—were relocated by the Jordanian government to a newly built village called Umm Sayhoun, about 10 km from Petra. The new village originally consisted of 100 houses. Umm Sayhoun offered infrastructure that had not existed in Petra, including a school, a part-time clinic, running water, a generator, and electrification. The government allotted each family an identical housing unit with an enclosed courtyard, two rooms, a kitchen, a storeroom, a toilet, and a rooftop water tank. Unlike in Petra, no provision was made for keeping animals, requiring livestock to remain in pasture elsewhere.

A similar event occurred in 2024, when the Jordanian government forced 24 Bedul out of caves and tents in al-Nabi Harun Mountain (al-Stooh) under the guise of preserving Petra. Remaining residents now have to commute 3 kilometres (1.9 mi) to reach water, in Umm Seyhoun, in which the water is polluted and not safe to drink.

== Origins ==
Various theories exist for the origins of the Bedul, the first states that they descend from Jews and/or Nabbateans, who historically resided in their present area. The second carries little evidence, and states that they arrived in Petra in the 18th-19th centuries. Yet another theory suggests Roma descent.

The earliest recorded account of Bedul origins comes from traveler John Wilson (1843). He interviewed the tribe's sheikh and was told that the Bedul were "the offspring of the Bene Israel". They stated they did not intermarry with Arabs but only with a related group they called the "Bene Israel of the Beit Shar." English sociologist Harriet Martineau recorded a similar account (1847). Based on this, Wilson concluded the Bedul were probably descendants of some ancient population of Idumaea. According to Kenneth W. Russell, the self identification of the Bedul as "Bene Israel" was not meant as a claim of Jewish ancestry, but served to differentiate the region's indigenous inhabitants from later Greek, Roman, Arab, and Turkoman arrivals. This distinction had precedent, since Arab tradition had already linked Petra's tombs to the "Children of Israel" as early as 1276.

Tawfik Canaan recorded a version (1929) in which Moses conquered Petra and spared twelve inhabitants who hid on Umm al-Biyara, a mountain close to Petra, and converted to Islam, thereby becoming the "Bdul" ("those who changed"). Margaret Murray (1937) recorded a similar version stating the Bedul had been Jews who changed their religion to Islam. According to Russel, this narrative of an ancient Jewish-to-Islamic conversion became increasingly unpopular as Jewish immigration and Palestinian nationalism grew during the British Mandate period, so the tradition was revised, first to place any Jewish connection at the time of the Islamic conquest rather than in deep antiquity, and eventually, in the most recent versions, to drop any reference to Judaism at all in favor of a claim of direct Nabataean descent.
