= Daughter of Darkness (novel) =

1972 novel by J. R. Lowell

Daughter of Darkness is a 1972 psychological thriller written by Jan and Robert Lowell, a husband and wife who use the joint pseudonym J. R. Lowell.

== Plot ==
A young woman named Willamina "Willie" Connolly is the daughter of a prosperous New York couple, editor Matt Connolly and his wife Willamina, an Irish concert pianist. Willie is a child prodigy with an extremely high IQ. Her parents believe her to be a happy, contented child, but this is a carefully contrived mask. Her primary motivation is independence; she detests anyone making decisions for her, especially based on her age or appearance. Her very name, Willamina Junior, made her feel like a bad carbon copy, until she discovered Gertrude Stein's The World Is Round and began to call herself Willie.

She has made a thorough study of anthropology and is an accomplished practitioner of witchcraft and sympathetic magic. Her doll collection is actually an array of poppets which she uses to curse those who displease her. This backfires on her when one of her spells leads to her mother's death. Willie's remorse and her wish to see her father happy again develops over the years into incestuous desire, although Willie herself does not realize it.

== Sources ==
Willie's incantation "Everything that is won't be/ Everything that isn't will be" is from Charles Fort's Book of the Damned. Her sickness-causing chant "A big pain a little pain/ A small pain a great pain" is from Witchcraft: Its Power in the World Today by William Seabrook.

== Reviews ==
Kirkus Reviews said: "This is an Other-directed attempt to reach just that market by two script writers who have a perfectly satisfactory story except that it's so obviously prearranged. Willie, circa twelve, is the unnatural child of a talented couple who obviously haven't been paying enough attention to her and her solitary pursuits. When Willie's about to be sent away so that they can travel alone together, she takes to her dolls and her magic books and before very long her mother becomes despondently ill and commits suicide. For two years Willie and her father are undisturbed by the outside world except for the visits of an old friend, a 'ghost hunter,' and finally Elizabeth with whom her father falls in love. Once again not for long, although Jonathan tries and fails to curb the powers of this little pig-tailed Sybil Leek. . . . A readymade item and without sticking too many pins in it, let it go at the fact that it's neither as evil nor frightening as it could have been, should have been."
