= William Seabrook =

American journalist (1884–1945)

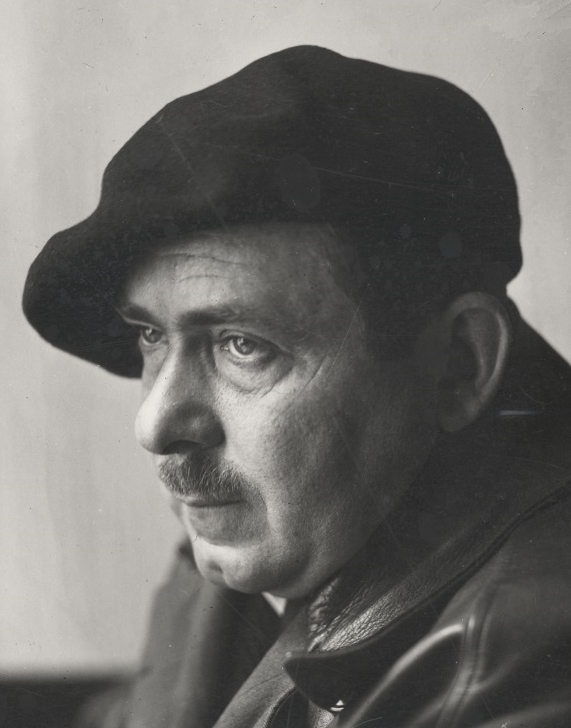
- William Seabrook in 1931
- Born: William Buehler Seabrook; February 22, 1884; Westminster, Maryland, US
- Died: September 20, 1945 (aged 61); Rhinebeck, New York, US
- Occupations: Writer; reporter
- Writing career
- Period: 20th century
- Genres: Occult, travel
- Movement: Lost Generation

William Buehler Seabrook (February 22, 1884 – September 20, 1945) was an American occultist, explorer, world traveler, journalist and author. He began his career as a reporter and city editor of the Augusta Chronicle in Georgia and later worked for the New York Times. He is well known for his writing on, and engaging in, cannibalism. Seabrook's 1929 book The Magic Island, which documents his experiences with Haitian Vodou, is considered the first popular English-language work to describe the concept of zombies.

== Early life ==
Seabrook was born in Westminster, Maryland. He graduated from Mercersburg Academy. He then attended Roanoke College where he earned a Bachelor of Philosophy. He went on to receive a Master of Arts from Newberry College and also studied philosophy at the University of Geneva in Switzerland. In 1908, Seabrook was hired as a reporter by the Augusta Chronicle and was soon promoted to the desk of city editor. He was later a partner with an advertising agency in Atlanta, Georgia.

In 1915, Seabrook joined the American Field Service of the French Army during World War I. He was stationed on the Western Front and served as an ambulance driver at the Battle of Verdun, where he was gassed. Seabrook was later awarded the Croix de Guerre and published an account of his war service (Diary of Section VIII) in 1917. Following the war, Seabrook became a reporter for the New York Times and soon adopted an itinerant lifestyle.

Besides his books, Seabrook published articles in popular magazines including Cosmopolitan, Reader's Digest, and Vanity Fair. Seabrook is credited with two extensive publications in the American tabloid press, which were published in the mid-1920s under the name Marian Dockerill and dealt with occultism, sexual magic and sadomasochism.

== Family life ==
In 1912, Seabrook married Katherine Pauline Edmondson. They divorced in 1934. Soon after, he married Marjorie Worthington in 1935. The marriage ended in 1941. This marriage was followed by his marriage to Constance Kuhr, which began in 1942 and ended with his death in 1945.

== Cannibalism ==
In the 1920s, Seabrook traveled to West Africa and came across a tribe who partook in the eating of human meat. Seabrook wrote about his experience of cannibalism in his travel book Jungle Ways; however, he later admitted that the tribe had not allowed him to join in on the ritualistic cannibalism. Instead, he had obtained samples of human flesh by persuading a medical intern at the Sorbonne University to give him a chunk of human meat from the body of a man who had died in an accident. He reported:

It was like good, fully developed veal, not young, but not yet beef. It was very definitely like that, and it was not like any other meat I had ever tasted. It was so nearly like good, fully developed veal that I think no person with a palate of ordinary, normal sensitiveness could distinguish it from veal. It was mild, good meat with no other sharply defined or highly characteristic taste such as for instance, goat, high game, and pork have. The [rump] steak was slightly tougher than prime veal, a little stringy, but not too tough or stringy to be agreeably edible. The [loin] roast, from which I cut and ate a central slice, was tender, and in color, texture, smell as well as taste, strengthened my certainty that of all the meats we habitually know, veal is the one meat to which this meat is accurately comparable.

Seabrook might have eaten human flesh also on another occasion. When his claim of having participated in ritualistic cannibalism turned out wrong (and he hadn't yet dared reveal the Sorbonne story), he was much mocked for it. According to his autobiography, the wealthy socialite Daisy Fellowes invited him to one of her garden parties, stating "I think you deserve to know what human flesh really tastes like". During the party, which was attended by about a dozen guests (some of them well-known), a piece of supposedly human flesh was grilled and eaten with much pomp. He comments that, while he never found out "the real truth" behind this meal, it "looked and tasted exactly" like the human flesh he had eaten before.

== Later life ==
In autumn 1919, English occultist Aleister Crowley spent a week with Seabrook at Seabrook's farm. Seabrook wrote a story based on the experience and to recount the experiment in Witchcraft: Its Power in the World Today.

In 1924, he traveled to Arabia and sampled the hospitality of various tribes of Bedouin and the Kurdish Yazidi. In the first part of the book, Seabrook seeks Mithqal Al-Fayez and lives with him and his tribe for several months. When the topic of religion came to them in conversation, Seabrook admitted to Mithqal that he did not believe in the Trinity, but rather in the oneness of God, and that God sent many prophets including Muhammad; on hearing this, Mithqal asked if William would like to enter Islam and William agreed, with him repeating the Shahada after Mithqal shortly after. Adventures in Arabia: among the Bedouins, Druses, Whirling Dervishes and Yezidee Devil Worshipers, his account of his travels, was published in 1927; its success enabled him to travel to Haiti, where he developed an interest in Haitian Vodou and the Culte des Mortes, which were described at length in his book The Magic Island. The book is credited with introducing the concept of a zombie to popular culture.

Seabrook had a lifelong fascination with the occult, which he witnessed and described firsthand, as documented in The Magic Island (1929), and Jungle Ways (1930). He later concluded that he had seen nothing that did not have a rational scientific explanation, a theory which he detailed in Witchcraft: Its Power in the World Today (1940).

In Air Adventure he describes a trip on board a Farman with captain René Wauthier, a famed pilot, and Marjorie Muir Worthington, from Paris to Timbuktu, where he collected a mass of documents from Father Yacouba, a defrocked monk who had an extensive collection of rare documents about the obscure city at that time administered by the French as part of French Sudan. The book is replete with information about French colonial life in the Sahara and pilots in particular.

In December 1933, Seabrook was committed at his own request and with the help of some of his friends to Bloomingdale, a mental institution in Westchester County, near New York City, for treatment for acute alcoholism. He remained a patient of the institution until the following July, and in 1935, he published an account of his experience, written as if it were another expedition to a foreign locale. The book, titled Asylum, became another best-seller. In the preface, he stated that his books were not "fiction or embroidery".

He married Marjorie Muir Worthington in France in 1935 after they had returned from a trip to Africa on which Seabrook was researching a book. Due to his alcoholism and sadistic practices, they divorced in 1941. She later wrote the biography The Strange World of Willie Seabrook, published in 1966.

== Death ==
On September 20, 1945, Seabrook died by suicide from a drug overdose in Rhinebeck, New York. He left behind one son, William.

== Popular culture ==
The Abominable Mr. Seabrook is a graphic biography of Seabrook by Joe Ollmann.

== Bibliography ==
=== Books ===
- Diary of Section VIII (1917)
- Adventures in Arabia (1927)
- The Magic Island (1929)
- Jungle Ways (1930)
- Air Adventure (1933)
- The White Monk of Timbuctoo (1934)
- Asylum (1935)
- These Foreigners: Americans All (1938)
- Witchcraft: Its Power in the World Today (1940)
- Doctor Wood: Modern Wizard of the Laboratory (1941)
- No Hiding Place: An Autobiography (1942)

=== Short stories ===
- "Wow!" (1921)
