= Daughters of Darkness and the Chronicles of Santon =

Daughters of Darkness and the Chronicles of Santon is a 1990 role-playing adventure for RuneQuest published by Avalon Hill.

== Plot summary ==
Daughters of Darkness and the Chronicles of Santon is an adventure in which the player characters contend against Cruella and Captain Ahab.

== Publication history ==
Shannon Appelcline explained that Chaosium stopped working for Avalon Hill by 1989 for financial reasons, so "Avalon Hill decided to continue RuneQuest by publishing non-Gloranthan material. However, rather than returning to their somewhat colourful Fantasy Earth, they instead published two books set in totally different fantasy milieus, Daughters of Darkness (1990) and Eldarad (1990). These books were widely derided by RuneQuest fans, in large part due to their lack of applicability to any RuneQuest game (except those of the authors)."

== Reception ==
Phillip Hessel reviewed Daughters of Darkness in White Wolf #43 (May, 1994), rating it a 3 out of 5 and stated that "This book is useful as a source of ideas to integrate into an established campaign. If your players' characters never stay in one place long enough to get familiar with the locals, you may find this book less rewarding."

== Reviews ==
- GamesMaster International (Issue 9 - Apr 1991)
