= List of horror films of the 1930s =

A list of horror films released in the 1930s.

== History ==
The American horror film industry was properly created in the 1930s, most notably the Universal Horror film productions. White Zombie is considered the first feature-length zombie film and has been described as the archetype and model of all zombie movies. A number of Hollywood actors made a name for themselves in horror films of this decade, in particular Bela Lugosi (Dracula, 1931) and Boris Karloff (Frankenstein, 1931). Fredric March won an Academy Award for Best Actor in Dr. Jekyll and Mr. Hyde, 1931. Films of this era frequently took their inspiration from the literature of gothic horror and more often dealt with themes of science versus religion rather than supernatural themes.

Many horror films of this era provoked public outcry and censors cut many of the more violent and gruesome scenes from such films as Frankenstein, Island of Lost Souls and The Black Cat. In 1933, the British Board of Film Censors (BBFC) introduced an "H" rating for films labeled "Horrific" for "any films likely to frighten or horrify children under the age of 16 years" and only a year later Hollywood initiated a strict production code limiting the violence and sexuality that could be portrayed in films. In 1935, the President of the BBFC Edward Shortt, wrote "although a separate category has been established for these [horrific] films, I am sorry to learn they are on the increase...I hope that the producers and renters will accept this word of warning, and discourage this type of subject as far as possible." As the United Kingdom was a significant market for Hollywood, American producers listened to Shortt's warning, and the number of Hollywood produced horror films decreased in 1936. A trade paper Variety reported that Universal Pictures abandonment of horror films after the release of Dracula's Daughter was that "European countries, especially England are prejudiced against this type product [sic]."

At the end of the decade, a profitable re-release of Dracula and Frankenstein would encourage Universal to produce Son of Frankenstein (1939), starting off a resurgence of the horror film that would continue into the mid-1940s.

== List ==
Horror films released in the 1930s
Title	Director	Cast	Country	Notes
1930
1931
Dracula	Tod Browning	Bela Lugosi, Helen Chandler, David Manners, Dwight Frye, Edward Van Sloan	United States	
Dracula	George Melford	Carlos Villarías, Lupita Tovar, Barry Norton	United States	
Frankenstein	James Whale	Colin Clive, Boris Karloff, Dwight Frye, Edward Van Sloan, Mae Clarke	United States	
Dr. Jekyll and Mr. Hyde	Rouben Mamoulian	Fredric March, Miriam Hopkins, Rose Hobart	United States	
The Phantom	Alan James	Guinn "Big Boy" Williams, Allene Ray, Niles Welch	United States	
1932
Behind the Mask	John Francis Dillon	Jack Holt, Constance Cummings, Boris Karloff	United States	
Castle Sinister	Widgey R. Newman	Haddon Mason, Wally Patch	United Kingdom	
Chandu the Magician	William Cameron Menzies, Marcel Varnel	Edmund Lowe, Irene Ware, Bela Lugosi, Herbert Mundin	United States	
Doctor X	Michael Curtiz	Lionel Atwill, Lee Tracy, Fay Wray	United States	
Freaks	Tod Browning	Wallace Ford, Leila Hyams	United States	
Island of Lost Souls	Erle C. Kenton	Charles Laughton, Bela Lugosi, Richard Arlen, Leila Hyams	United States	
Kongo	William J. Cowen	Walter Huston, Lupe Vélez, Conrad Nagel	United States	
The Mask of Fu Manchu	Charles J. Brabin, Charles Vidor, King Vidor	Boris Karloff, Lewis Stone, Karen Morley	United States	
The Monster Walks	Frank R. Strayer	Vera Reynolds, Sheldon Lewis	United States	
The Most Dangerous Game	Ernest B. Schoedsack	Joel McCrea, Fay Wray, Leslie Banks	United States	
The Mummy	Karl Freund	Boris Karloff, Zita Johann, David Manners	United States	
Murders in the Rue Morgue	Robert Florey	Sidney Fox, Bela Lugosi	United States	
The Old Dark House	James Whale	Boris Karloff, Melvyn Douglas, Charles Laughton, Gloria Stuart, Lilian Bond	United States	
Tianak	José Nepomuceno	Rosa Del Rosario, Rogelio de la Rosa	Philippines	
Unheimliche Geschichten	Richard Oswald	Paul Wegener, Harald Paulsen, Roma Bahn	Germany	
Vampyr	Carl Theodor Dreyer	Julian West, Maurice Schutz, Jan Hieronimko	France; Germany	
White Zombie	Victor Halperin	Bela Lugosi, Madge Bellamy, Joseph Cawthorn	United States	
1933
The Witch	George Musser	Celia Burgos-Xerxes, Luis Ayesa, Arturo Swanson, Matias Garcia, Monserrat Garcia	Philippines	
A Study in Scarlet	Edwin L. Marin	Reginald Owen, Anna May Wong, June Clyde, Alan Dinehart, John Warburton	United States	
La Llorona	Ramón Peón	Ramón Pereda, Virginia Zuri, Carlos Orellana	Mexico	
The Ghoul	T. Hayes Hunter	Boris Karloff, Cedric Hardwicke, Ernest Thesiger, Dorothy Hyson, Anthony Bushell	United Kingdom	
The Invisible Man	James Whale	Claude Rains, Gloria Stuart, Henry Travers, William Harrigan	United States	
The Monkey's Paw	Wesley Ruggles, Ernest B. Schoedsack	Ivan Simpson, C. Aubrey Smith, Bramwell Fletcher	United States	
Murders in the Zoo	Edward Sutherland	Charlie Ruggles, Lionel Atwill, Gail Patrick, Randolph Scott	United States	
Mystery of the Wax Museum	Michael Curtiz	Lionel Atwill, Fay Wray, Glenda Farrell, Frank McHugh	United States	
Night of Terror	Benjamin Stoloff	Bela Lugosi, George Meeker, Tully Marshall	United States	
Secret of the Blue Room	Kurt Neumann	Lionel Atwill, Gloria Stuart, Paul Lukas	United States	
Supernatural	Victor Halperin	Carole Lombard, Alan Dinehart, Vivienne Osborne	United States	
Terror Aboard	Paul Sloane	John Halliday, Charlie Ruggles, Shirley Grey, Neil Hamilton, Jack La Rue, Verree Teasdale	United States	
The Vampire Bat	Frank Strayer	Lionel Atwill, Fay Wray, Melvyn Douglas, Maude Eburne	United States	
1934
The Black Cat	Edgar G. Ulmer	Boris Karloff, Bela Lugosi, David Manners, Jacqueline Wells	United States	
Black Moon	Roy William Neill	Jack Holt, Fay Wray, Dorothy Burgess	United States	
Chloe, Love Is Calling You	Marshall Neilan	Olive Borden, Georgette Harvey, Reed Howes	United States	
Double Door	Charles Vidor	Evelyn Venable, Mary Morris, Anne Revere, Kent Taylor	United States	
House of Mystery	William Nigh	Ed Lowry, Verna Hillie, John Sheehan	United States	
Maniac	Dwain Esper	Bill Woods, Thea Ramsey	United States	
Menace	Ralph Murphy	Gertrude Michael, Paul Cavanagh, Henrietta Crosman, John Lodge	United States	
The Ninth Guest	Roy William Neill	Donald Cook, Genevieve Tobin	United States	
The Phantom of the Convent	Fernando de Fuentes	Marta Roel, Carlos Villatoro, Enrique del Campo	Mexico	
The Tell-Tale Heart	Brian Desmond Hurst	Norman Dryden, John Kelt, Yolande Terrell	United Kingdom	
1935
Air Hawks	Albert S. Rogell	Ralph Bellamy, Tala Birell, Wiley Post, Douglas Dumbrille	United States	
The Black Room	Roy William Neill	Boris Karloff, Marian Marsh	United States	
Bride of Frankenstein	James Whale	Boris Karloff, Colin Clive, Valerie Hobson, Elsa Lanchester, Ernest Thesiger, Dwight Frye	United States	
Condemned to Live	Frank Strayer	Ralph Morgan, Maxine Doyle, Russell Gleason	United States	
The Crime of Dr. Crespi	John H. Auer	Erich von Stroheim, Dwight Frye, Paul Guilfoyle	United States	
Dante's Inferno	Harry Lachman	Spencer Tracy, Claire Trevor, Rita Hayworth	United States	
Mad Love	Karl Freund	Peter Lorre, Frances Drake, Colin Clive, Ted Healy, Sara Haden	United States	
Mark of the Vampire	Tod Browning	Lionel Barrymore, Elizabeth Allan, Bela Lugosi	United States	
Ouanga	George Terwilliger	Fredi Washington, Sheldon Leonard, Philip Brandon	United States	
The Raven	Lew Landers, Louis Friedlander	Boris Karloff, Bela Lugosi, Irene Ware	United States	
The Student of Prague	Arthur Robison	Anton Walbrook, Dorothea Wieck, Theodor Loos	Nazi Germany	
Werewolf of London	Stuart Walker	Henry Hull, Warner Oland, Valerie Hobson	United States	
1936
The Devil-Doll	Tod Browning	Lionel Barrymore, Maureen O'Sullivan	United States	
Dracula's Daughter	Lambert Hillyer	Otto Kruger, Gloria Holden	United States	
Fährmann Maria	Frank Wisbar	Sybille Schmitz, Peter Voss, Aribert Mog	Nazi Germany	
The Golem	Julien Duvivier	Harry Baur, Germaine Dussey, Roger Karl	Czechoslovakia; France	
The Invisible Ray	Lambert Hillyer	Bela Lugosi, Frances Drake, Frank Lawton, Walter Kingsford	United States	
El Baúl Macabro	Miguel Zacarías	Esther Fernández, Ramón Pereda, René Cardona	Mexico	
The Man Who Changed His Mind	Robert Stevenson	Boris Karloff, Anna Lee, John Loder, Frank Cellier	United Kingdom	
Mga Kaluluwang Napaligaw	Carlos Vander Tolosa	Carlos Padilla Sr. Nela Álvarez, Gregorio Fernandez, Teodorico Bemavidez, Exequel Segovia	Philippines	
Revolt of the Zombies	Victor Halperin	Dorothy Stone, Dean Jagger, Roy D'Arcy, Robert Noland	United States	
Sweeney Todd: The Demon Barber of Fleet Street	George King	Tod Slaughter, Stella Rho, John Singer, Eve Lister	United Kingdom	
The Walking Dead	Michael Curtiz	Boris Karloff, Ricardo Cortez, Edmund Gwenn, Marguerite Churchill	United States	
1937
Anak Ng kadiliman	Mar I. Esmeralda	Angel Esmeralda, Purita Sta. Maria, Maria Clara Ruiz, Tito Arévalo, Tita Duran	Philippines	
Bakas Ng Kalansay	Eduardo de Castro	Fernando Poe, Miguel Anzures, Mari Velez	Philippines	
Demon Man	Tor Villano	Rosa Del Rosario, Gregorio Fernandez	Philippines	
Night Key	Lloyd Corrigan	Boris Karloff, Warren Hull, Jean Rogers, Alan Baxter	United States	
1938
The Black Doll	Otis Garrett	Donald Woods, Nan Grey, Edgar Kennedy	United States	
The Missing Guest	John Rawlins	Paul Kelly, Constance Moore, William Lundigan	United States	
1939
Buried Alive	Victor Halperin	Paul McVey, Beverly Roberts, Wheeler Oakman	United States	
The Cat and the Canary	Elliott Nugent	Bob Hope, Paulette Goddard, John Beal	United States	
The Dark Eyes of London	Walter Summers	Béla Lugosi, Hugh Williams, Greta Gynt	United Kingdom	
The Face at the Window	George King	Tod Slaughter, John Warwick	United Kingdom	
The Gorilla	Allan Dwan	Ritz Brothers, Anita Louise, Patsy Kelly	United States	
La Herencia Macabra	José Bohr	Miguel Arenas, Consuela Frank, Ramón Armengod	Mexico	
The House of Fear	Joe May	William Gargan, Irene Hervey, Dorothy Arnold, Alan Dinehart, Harvey Stephens, Walter Woolf King	United States	
The Man They Could Not Hang	Nick Grinde	Boris Karloff, Lorna Gray, Robert Wilcox, Don Beddoe	United States	
Mystery of the White Room	Otis Garrett	Bruce Cabot, Helen Mack	United States	
The Return of Doctor X	Vincent Sherman	Humphrey Bogart, Rosemary Lane, Dennis Morgan, John Litel	United States	
Son of Frankenstein	Rowland V. Lee	Basil Rathbone, Boris Karloff, Bela Lugosi, Lionel Atwill, Josephine Hutchinson	United States	
Torture Ship	Victor Halperin	Lyle Talbot, Irving Pichel, Julie Bishop, Sheila Bromley	United States	

== See also ==
- Lists of horror films
