= The Magic Island =

1929 book by William Seabrook

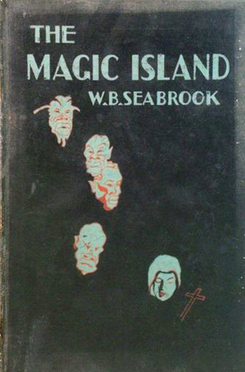
- First edition cover
- Author: William Seabrook
- Illustrator: Alexander King
- Language: English
- Subject: Haiti and Haitian Vodou
- Genre: Travelogue
- Publisher: Harcourt, Brace & Company
- Publication date: January 3, 1929
- Publication place: United States

The Magic Island is a book by American explorer and traveler William Seabrook. First published in 1929 by Harcourt, Brace & Company, The Magic Island is an account of Seabrook's experiences with Haitian Vodou in Haiti, and is considered the first popular English-language work to describe the concept of a zombie, defined by Seabrook as "a soulless human corpse, still dead, but taken from the grave and endowed by sorcery with a mechanical semblance of life—it is a dead body which is made to walk and act and move as if it were alive."

The Magic Island was published on January 3, 1929, and was named one of that month's best-selling non-fiction books by Baker & Taylor. It received praise from critics at the time for its characterization of the people and culture of Haiti and its exploration of Vodou, although some reviewers questioned Seabrook's credibility and the accuracy of the material. Retrospective reviews have been critical of the book's depiction of Haiti and Vodou, especially in relation to the United States' then-ongoing occupation of Haiti.

The book has been credited with popularizing the image of zombies as products of Vodou and witchcraft: it inspired the 1932 New York stage play Zombie, written by Kenneth Webb, and influenced the 1932 horror film White Zombie, directed by Victor Halperin; the latter is widely considered the first feature-length zombie film.

In 2016, The Magic Island was reprinted by Dover Publications, with an introduction written by George A. Romero.

On January 1st, 2025, the book entered the public domain.

== Summary ==
The Magic Island documents William Seabrook's experiences on a trip to Haiti, during which time he immersed himself in Haitian Vodou, an African diasporic religion that developed in the country between the 16th and 19th centuries. According to Seabrook's account, he interacted with a Vodou priestess, Maman Celie, who initiated him in rituals that involved drinking blood, the transferring of souls, and resurrection. In the chapter "Goat-Cry Girl-Cry", Seabrook describes one such ceremony, in which a goat is sacrificed in substitution for a Haitian girl. Seabrook not only draws comparisons between the practice of Vodou in Haiti and the practice of Christianity in the United States, but also notes the syncretic presence of Christian iconography and beliefs in Haitian Vodou. He regards with mixed feelings the then-ongoing United States occupation of Haiti, which began in 1915 and would continue until 1934.

The book is notable for the chapter "Dead Men Working in the Cane Fields", which describes zombies (from the Haitian Creole word zonbi)—human corpses that have been reanimated through magical means, in this case to perform labor. The Magic Island is considered the first popular English-language publication to describe the concept of a zombie as an undead, or "living dead", being; the term had appeared in English print prior to The Magic Island, but was used to describe other concepts in Vodou, such as a snake god.

== Publication ==
When seeking to publish The Magic Island, Seabrook was offered US$15,000 by a magazine for the rights to serialize the book. However, he declined the offer after learning that significant alterations would be made to the text, including the removal of any references to Maman Celie. Seabrook opted instead to have the book published in hardcover by Harcourt, Brace & Company.

Harcourt published The Magic Island on January 3, 1929. It was selected as the Literary Guild of New York's "book of the month", and was listed by Baker & Taylor as one of the best-selling non-fiction books in the United States that January. A French translation of the book was published in 1932.

== Critical reception ==
=== Contemporary reviews ===
Upon the book's release, Addie May Swan of the Davenport Daily Times wrote that Seabrook, in comparing the religious and lifestyle practices of the Haitian people and white Americans, demonstrates that "no two races are very far apart after all". Swan notes Seabrook's openness, writing that he "seems to argue for a greater understanding and a greater and finer tolerance", and that "Only an observer of Mr. Seabrook's tolerance and sympathy could have gone to Haiti and have emerged with a book on native life as penetrating as The Magic Island". John Dandridge Stanard of the Chattanooga Daily Times called the book "the result of months in Haiti and of over two years' hard work. Between its lines there lie dark mysteries. But for anyone to see, there is the author's genius, which has made of this profound study a true work of literature."

F. Van de Water, in his review of the book for the New York Evening Post, wrote that, "The Magic Island seems to us the best and most thrilling book of exploration that we have ever read. Mr. Seabrook has investigated Voodooism, not with the rigid superiority of the average white man delving into native lore, but humbly, respectfully, as an initiate himself. [...] He has done a successful, vivid, and we believe, an immensely important book." The Brooklyn Daily Eagle's George Currie wrote that The Magic Island "reeks with sacrificial blood, the odor of cadavers, the sinister breath of witchcraft, the horrendous exaltation of unholy terrors slaked in the steaming passions of human animals. It is a grim story of Voodooism, this The Magic Island, filled with sickening mummeries, repulsive rituals, orgiastic expiations and propitiations. [...] And armed with an uncanny ability to woo the reader into his own experiences, [Seabrook] has again created a book that commands attention, although it has no other literary distinction than to be extraordinarily interesting."

French surrealist writer and ethnographer Michel Leiris gave the French edition of The Magic Island a positive review in the magazine Documents, commending Seabrook for his "humane attitude" towards the subject and calling him a "conscientious observer and the first man of the white race initiated into the mysteries of Vodou".

A reviewer for the American Journal of Sociology called the book "A series of excellent stories about one of the most interesting corners of the American world, told by a keen and sensitive person who knows how to write," and stated that Seabrook "has written as an artist, not an ethnographer." An author for The Yale Review wrote less favorably of Seabrook's style and accuracy: "He spoils much of his material by his exaggerated style and his dubious psychology." A reviewer for the New Statesman similarly concluded: "Although Mr. Seabrook has seen a great deal more than the average white man sees in the island, he has become so excited about it all that he cannot hope to be taken as an altogether credible witness. In the chapters on Voodoo, particularly, he mixes quite valuable material with a lot of hearsay, legend, and speculation, which are merely sensational."

=== Retrospective assessments ===
In 2001, academic Colin Dayan argued that The Magic Island exoticized Haiti and its people, and in doing so functioned "for the delectation of readers in the United States who sought justification for the occupation of Haiti." She wrote: "Making Haiti and its inhabitants the stuff of legends obscures the less easily articulated facts of race and class as they play out in daily life in the postindependence Caribbean. [...] During the occupation of Haiti by the United States, tales of cannibalism, sorcery, and zombies helped to justify the presence of the marines, and representations of Vodou have continued to have serious political consequences."

In 2005, author and art historian Christopher Green disagreed with Leiris's characterization of The Magic Island, writing: "It is important to realise that, if Leiris read Seabrook as a polemic against racism, his book can be read as preserving racist stereotypes of a savage and exotic Haiti, and as standing for attitudes that oppose the development there of a modern nation [...] in a real sense, Seabrook's The Magic Island actually reinforced racist convictions. It is necessary to take account of Leiris's radical reversal of the hierarchical relationship between the 'civilized' and the 'uncivilized' to grasp how he could read Seabrook as anti-racist."

In 2012, author and film critic Glenn Kay suggested that Seabrook exaggerated his experiences in Haiti in order to thrill readers, writing that, in addition to his descriptions of zombies, "Readers would be further alarmed by Seabrook's own descriptions of the voodoo practitioners responsible for zombies as 'blood-maddened' and 'sex-maddened' and by his claim that he visited the supposed zombies and confirmed their authenticity. It is only in the last paragraph that Seabrook all too briefly suggests that drugs causing a lethargic coma may have been responsible for the zombies' condition."

In 2021, author David Frohnapfel criticized The Magic Island as a "Pseudo-ethnographic, racist [writing]", and wrote that it was "part of a larger racist discourse that tried to legitimize and reinterpreted the USA's aggressive hegemonic expansion into the Caribbean as a 'civilizing' mission by demonizing Haitian society and culture in the process."

== Influence and legacy ==
The Magic Island inspired the stage play Zombie, written by Kenneth Webb, which opened in Manhattan, New York City, in February 1932. It also influenced the horror film White Zombie, directed by Victor Halperin, which was released in July of that same year. White Zombie is widely considered the first feature-length zombie film. A modern concept of zombies as infectious, flesh-eating beings—distinct from the zombies of Haitian folklore—would emerge in popular culture during the latter half of the 20th century; this version of zombies derives largely from the 1968 George A. Romero-directed film Night of the Living Dead, which itself drew inspiration from the 1954 Richard Matheson novel I Am Legend.

In 2016, The Magic Island was reprinted by Dover Publications. This edition features an introduction written by Romero, as well as a foreword by cartoonist Joe Ollmann and an afterword by anthropologist Wade Davis.

== See also ==
- The Serpent and the Rainbow (book)
