= Revolt of the Zombies =

1936 film by Victor Hugo Halperin

- Directed by: Victor Halperin
- Written by: Victor Halperin; Howard Higgin; Rollo Lloyd
- Produced by: Edward Halperin
- Starring: Dorothy Stone; Dean Jagger; Roy D'Arcy; Robert Noland; George Cleveland; E. Alyn Warren; Carl Stockdale
- Cinematography: Jockey Arthur Feindel; Arthur Martinelli
- Edited by: Douglass Biggs
- Music by: Charles Dunworth; Hugo Riesenfeld
- Production companies: Victor & Edward Halperin Productions
- Distributed by: Academy Pictures Distributing Corporation
- Release date: June 4, 1936
- Running time: 64 minutes
- Country: United States
- Language: English

Revolt of the Zombies is a 1936 American horror film directed by Victor Halperin, produced by Edward Halperin, and starring Dean Jagger and Dorothy Stone. One of the earliest zombie films, it was initially conceived as a loose sequel to the director's moderately successful White Zombie (1932) but, due to a lawsuit, was unable to promote itself as such.

Although uncredited, Bela Lugosi's eyes appear in Revolt whenever zombifying-powers are used; it is the same image of Lugosi's eyes used in White Zombie. When compared with Halperin's previous work, Revolt is generally regarded as a disappointment.

== Plot ==
On the Franco-Austrian Frontier during World War I, an Oriental priest, chaplain of a French colonial regiment, is condemned to life imprisonment because he possesses the power to turn men into zombies. In his prison cell, the priest prepares to burn a parchment containing the location of the secret formula. Gen. Mazovia (Roy D'Arcy) kills the priest and takes the partially burned parchment. After the war, an expedition of representatives from the Allied countries with colonial interests are sent to Cambodia to find and destroy forever the so-called "Secret of the Zombies". The group includes General Mazovia; a student of dead languages, Armand Louque (Dean Jagger); Englishman Clifford Grayson (Robert Noland); General Duval (George Cleveland); and his daughter Claire (Dorothy Stone).

Armand falls in love with Claire, who accepts his proposal of marriage to spite Clifford, whom she really loves. Later, when Claire runs to Cliff for comfort following an accident, Armand breaks the engagement, leaving her free to marry Cliff. Further accidents caused by Mazovia result in the natives refusing to work, forcing the expedition to return to Phnom Penh. Armand finds a clue which he had overlooked before and returns to Angkor against orders.

After viewing an ancient ceremony at a temple, Armand follows one of the servants of a high priest out of the temple, through a swamp, to a mysterious bronze doorway. When the servant leaves, Armand goes through the door to a room paneled in bronze, with an idol holding a gong. He accidentally strikes the gong, and a panel in the wall opens, revealing a small metal tablet. He translates the inscription and realizes that it is the secret for which they have all been looking. He alone now has the power to make zombies out of people, and begins with a practice run on his servant before using his zombie powers in an attempt to coerce the fickle Claire in the movie's climax.

== Cast ==
- Dorothy Stone as Claire Duval
- Dean Jagger as Armand Louque
- Roy D'Arcy as Gen. Mazovia
- Robert Noland as Clifford Grayson
- George Cleveland as Gen. Duval
- E. Alyn Warren as Dr. Trevissant
- Carl Stockdale as Ignacio / Max MacDonald
- William Crowell as Priest Tsiang
- Teru Shimada as Buna
- Adolph Milar as Gen. von Schelling
- Sana Rayya as Dancer

== Production ==
On September 3, 1935, Louella Parsons reported that Bela Lugosi was to star in The Revolt of the Zombie. By November, trades papers announced that brothers Victor and Edward Halperin would create a sequel to White Zombie that would be produced by Academy Pictures with no mention of Lugosi.

A camera crew was sent to Angkor, Indochina to film background shots. Production was behind schedule in January 1936 with no script complete while the Halperins planned on filming in February. The film only commenced production on March 9 with the shoot completed later in the month.

In May, however, the Halperins encountered legal troubles in the form of a suit from Amusement Securities Corporation, a financer of White Zombie. Amusement Securities alleged that its contract for the earlier film gave it the exclusive right to use the word "zombie" in motion picture titles. Amusement Securities sent letters to theaters who planned to showcase Revolt, warning them not to screen. As the premiere approached, Judge Waservogel of the New York State Supreme Court ruled that screenings could take place until a judgement in the suit was reached, and appointed attorney Henry Hoffman to referee the case. On June 27, Hoffman issued an opinion in favor of the plaintiffs, awarding Amusement Securities $11,500 in damages and legal fees and prohibiting the Halperins from promoting Revolt as a sequel to White Zombie.

== Release ==
The film is in the public domain.

=== Reception ===
Writing in The Zombie Movie Encyclopedia, academic Peter Dendle called it "an uninvolving follow-up to White Zombie that could not have been saved by Bela Lugosi." Glenn Kay, author of Zombie Movies: The Ultimate Guide, said, "There's no experimentation here, only dull composition and flatly lit shots of yakking characters in by-the-numbers plot."
