= A Thousand Deaths =

A Thousand Deaths may refer to:

- "A Thousand Deaths" (London short story), an 1899 short story by Jack London
- "A Thousand Deaths" (Card short story), a short story by Orson Scott Card
- "A Thousand Deaths" (The Shield), an episode of the TV series The Shield
- "A Thousand Deaths" (Sliders), an episode of the TV series Sliders
