= Zombie Movies: The Ultimate Guide =

2008 book by Glenn Kay

- Author: Glenn Kay
- Language: English
- Subject: Film criticism
- Published: 2008 (Chicago Review Press)
- Publication place: United States
- Media type: Print
- Pages: 352
- ISBN: 978-1-55652-770-8

Zombie Movies: The Ultimate Guide is a 2008 non-fiction book by Glenn Kay about zombies in popular culture, primarily zombie films. It was updated in 2012 to include television episodes and more films.

== Publication ==
The initial printing was in 2008. A second edition was published on October 1, 2012.

== Contents ==
Kay traces the history of zombie films from White Zombie in 1932 to modern days. The updated version has reviews of approximately 400 films and adds reviews of television shows, such as The Walking Dead. Films are rated on a five-point scale, which includes a "so bad it's good" score. Also included are interviews and film stills.

== Reception ==
Jeremy Martin of San Antonio Current wrote that Kay "most certainly makes some omissions" and has idiosyncratic inclusion criteria, but the writing is humorous. Martin suggests that Kay's list of top films would make a "great start for beginners". Justin Dimos of PopMatters rated it 7/10 stars and called it "the zombie movie bible for the film student and horror moviegoer". Reviewing the updated edition, Rod Lott of the Oklahoma Gazette wrote, "With hundreds of capsule reviews and nearly as many photos and posters, it’s something no self-respecting psychotronic film fan should be without ... especially now that it's grown even larger." Doug Sarti of The Georgia Straight wrote, "With such a wealth of information, Kay's book is bound to keep any zombiephile entertained for days, reliving the thrill of favourite classics." Ryan Daley of Bloody Disgusting wrote, "Kay is a knowledgeable writer with a dry sense of humor, and while he offers some genuinely keen observations regarding the evolution of the subgenre, some readers will vehemently disagree with his individual ratings."
