= H. Maurice Jacquet =

French composer and conductor

Maurice Henri Louis Fernand Jacquet
- Born: Maurice Henri Louis Fernand Jacquet; 18 March 1886; Saint-Mandé
- Died: 29 June 1954 (aged 68); New York
- Occupations: Composer; Conductor
- Spouse: Andrée Amalou-Jacquet (harpist)

Maurice Henri Louis Fernand Jacquet (18 March 1886 – 29 June 1954) was a 20th-century French composer and conductor. He died on June 29, 1954, in New York.

== Biography ==
The son of Alfred Eugene Gustave Jacquet, a photographer, and Jeanne Joséphine Henriette Noël, a singing teacher, H. Maurice Jacquet initially intended to become a virtuoso. He engaged in serious musical study under the direction of Francis Thomé, a composer and pianist. Since he showed serious provisions for musical composition, he followed his earlier training with lessons from Émile Pessard, a professor at the Conservatoire de Paris.

A student of conductor Alexandre Luigini, he regularly directed works by Jules Massenet and Gustave Charpentier.

H. Maurice Jacquet composed art songs, symphonic poems for soloists and orchestra as well as piano works. The creation of Messaouda, a one-act opéra comique written with Davin de Champclos and Andre Mauprey, was incredibly successful and received with great praise when it premiered at the Théâtre Moncey in Paris. Romanitza, a lyrical drama in four acts on a poem by Maurice Magre, was also presented with great success in April 1913 at the Théâtre Municipal of Calais. He also wrote the musicals La Petite Dactylo (1916) and L'As de cœur.' Both were composed in 1917 but their first performances were held in 1925. For a while, H. Maurice Jacquet was conductor at the Théâtre de l'Odéon, then during the 1920s, he moved to America with his wife, harpist Andrée Amalou-Jacquet. He had also travelled to places including Canada, Cuba (where he directed the National Philharmonic Orchestra for some time), although finally arriving in Broadway in 1929–1930. He composed two musical comedies and film music while living in Hollywood.

In 1926 Maurice, along with Ernö Rapée, Frederick Stahlberg (for a short-time), and Charles Previn, was appointed as music staff at the newly opened Roxy Theatre. In the same year, he took part in the Federation of French Veterans of the Great War Inc, Grand Concert and Annual Ball held at the Hotel Plaza in New York alongside other musician and performers like Lucienne Boyer, Doris Niles, Leon Rothier, M. Van De Putte, and Raymonde Delaunois.

In 1937, he founded the third version of the American Opera Company in Trenton, NJ. It would perform two operatic productions before dissolving.

== Education ==
He began his musical training with the Composer and Pianist Francis Thomé, quickly becoming his favorite pupil. After having his ingenious aptitude for composition acknowledged by his parents, he was sent to study with the Composer Mr. Emile Pessard, who was a professor of composition at the National Conservatory in Paris. Under his direction, his skills grew rapidly and became known for his individual aesthetic, shaped by but not beholden to influences past and present. He also studied conducting under the French composer and conductor Alexandre Luigini, and through this training, he made collegial friendships with well-known composers like Jules Massenet and M. Gustave Charpentier.

== Marriage ==
On April 14, 1904, Maurice Jacquet was married to Rebecca Dusserele (1876-?) in the 18th arrondissement of Paris. However, he divorced her four years later on May 18, 1908. He would then remarry on 9 January 1909 to the singer Helena Anna Marx (1886-1978), daughter of Viktor Marx (1850-?) and Sophie Berthe Brunschwik (1864-1909?) in the 9th arrondissement of Paris. He would remain married for 11 years before divorcing again, this time wedding his final wife, harpist and daughter of famed conductor Auguste Amalou, Andrée Augustine Louise George dit Amalou (1899-?), otherwise known as Andrée Amalou-Jacquet. They would be married in the commune Ézanville in the Seine-et-Oise [now Val-d'Oise] department in Île-de-France.

== Dedications ==
Maurice Baron(1889-1964), a 20th-century French-American clarinetist and composer of film scores and "photoplay music" [music to accompany silent films], dedicated his 1928 piano work "Love's Splendor" to Jacquet.

In 1911, Maurice Jacquet dedicated his melodie "Song of the inconstant" to the French lyric tenor Edmond Clément.

== Compositions ==
=== Vocal works ===
- 1908: Messaouda, one-act opéra comique, libretto by Davin de Champclos, music with André de Mauprey
- 1908: Sbarra, four-act opéra comique, libretto by Victor Canon and Saint-Aryan
- Before 1913: Romanitza, four-act lyrical drama, libretto by Maurice Magre
- 1916: Le Poilu, two-act comédie-opérette, libretto by Maurice Hennequin and Pierre Veber
- 1916: La Petite Dactylo, three-act vaudeville, libretto by Maurice Hennequin and Georges Mitchell
- 1919: Aux jardins de Murcie : (suite murcienne) : three-act opera
- 1920: Son Altesse Papillon, three-act operetta libretto by P. Celval and André Mauprey, music with André Mauprey
- 1925: L'As de cœur ou Jim-Jim, three-act operetta, libretto by André Mauprey
- 1930: The Well of Romance, two-act comedy operetta, libretto by Preston Sturges

=== Mélodies ===
- 1911: Chanson de l'Inconstant, for piano and voice, poem by Maurice Magre
- Si je pouvais mourir, for voice and piano
- Sérénade inutile, for voice and piano
- Les enfants, for voice and piano
- Tes yeux, for voice and piano
- Les vieilles de chez nous, for piano and voice
- Novembre
- Patrie air de Rysoor
- A une amie
- Berceuse amoureuse
- Invocation à Marie, poem by H. Jacquet (1916)
- Renouveau
- Toi, poem by H. Jacquet

=== Arias ===
- Damnation de Faust sérénade, for voice and piano (Piano reduction of the aria "Serenade De Mephistopheles" from H. Berlioz's La damnation de Faust)
- Xerxès, for piano and voice (Translated version of "Ombra Mai Fu" from G. F. Handel's oratorio)

=== Artsongs ===
- Benvenuto Cellini, for piano and voice

=== Symphonic works ===
- Dawn twilight
- Angelesque
- Elegie

=== Instrumental ===
- Cantique à l'ancienne, for harp
- 1925: Bouquet de Noëls : airs canadiens, for violin with accompanying piano or organ
- 1927: The love-waltz

=== Piano works ===
- Nocturnes
- Air de Ballet
- Sonnet frivole
- Danses des Saisons
- 1925: Rhapsodie sur un chant canadien "Alouette"
- 1927: The cuckoo clock Op.1, for piano or harp in olden style

=== Film Scores ===
- 1917: Ils y viennent tous au cinéma, mixture of film and live orchestration at the Nouvel Ambigu Theater
- 1929: The Holy Terror, Family Comedy
- 1930: Bear Shooters, Family Comedy
- 1932: White Zombie, American horror film

=== Cantata ===
- 1927: The mystic trumpeter, for mixed voices and orchestra with children's chorus

=== Unfinished ===
- Loïs, unfinished, poem by MB de Grancey

== Literary works ==
=== Books ===
- 1947: The road to successful singing

== Recordings ==
1. Benvenuto Cellini, for piano and voice
2. White Zombie [trailer]: Victor Halperin (Director), Edward Halperin (Producer), Halperin Productions, 1932 (full movie)
3. 1923: Sérénade inutile, for voice and piano
4. 1923: Si je pouvais mourir, for voice and piano
5. Recording session of five of Maurice Jacquet's mélodie and two aria's [Unknown singer, but most likely French baritone Joseph Saucier] in Montreal, Canada (1923).
  1. Les enfants
  2. Tes yeux
  3. Les vieilles de chez nous
  4. Xerxès
  5. Novembre
  6. Patrie air de Rysoor
  7. Damnation de Faust sérénade

== See also ==
- List of French composers
- Music of France
- French classical music
- Lists of composers
- Conservatoire de Paris
