= Buried Alive (1939 film) =

- Directed by: Victor Halperin
- Screenplay by: George Bricker
- Story by: William A. Ullman Jr.
- Produced by: Ben N. Judell
- Cinematography: Jack Greenhalgh
- Edited by: Holbrook Todd
- Production company: Producers Pictures Corp.
- Distributed by: Producers Pictures Corp.
- Release date: 6 November 1939
- Running time: 62 minutes
- Country: United States

Buried Alive is a 1939 film directed by Victor Halperin.

== Production ==
After finishing Torture Ship, director Victor Halperin started production on his next film Buried Alive. The film began shooting in the first half of October 1939 for Producer's Pictures Corporation.

Actor Clem Wilenchick (aka Crane Whitley) was scheduled to play the character of Manning, but as the shooting began he was replaced by Wheeler Oakman. The Call Bureau Cast Service initially mentioned that Archie Twitchell would portray Carson, and was replaced by Dave O'Brien.

== Release ==
Buried Alive was distributed theatrically by Producers Pictures Corp. on November 6, 1939.

== Reception ==
The Film Daily found the film "falls short of being a convincing drama. It will probably be okay as program material in the smalle nabe houses" but found Halperin's direction merely "O.K." Variety declared the film "Inferior all the way, particularly in its direction and playing, outside of Beverly Roberts".

A critic from The New York Post declared the film "so bad it seems almost like a new experience. Judging from the quality of most of the acting and direction, I should guess that it was a quickie film originally scheduled for six days' shooting but shortened to four" and concluded that "Buried Alive heads the January mustn't list."
