= Gaston Borch =

French composer (1871–1926)

Gaston Louis Christopher Borch (8 March 1871 – 14 February 1926) was a French composer, arranger, conductor, cellist and author. His works include orchestral music, opera and music for silent films. He played and conducted with orchestras in Europe and the USA.

== Early life ==
Borch was born in Guînes, Pas de Calais, France. His mother, Emma Hennequin, a pianist and soprano, was a friend and pupil of Jules Massenet, whom she met when he stayed at her father's boarding house, and with whom she is known to have performed. His father, Christopher Wolner Borch, was Norwegian. Borch's sister Frida was also an accomplished pianist.

== Career ==
Borch played the cello. He studied for three years with Massenet in France, with Jules Delsart and also at the Valand School of Fine Arts in Sweden. During the 1890s he spent time variously as conductor of the Christiania Orchestral Society and the Central Theatre in Christiana (now Oslo), and was also a visiting conductor in various European countries. His reported conducting credits include the Amsterdam Symphony Orchestra; Brussels Opera Orchestra; Société Symphonique, Lille; Crystal Palace Orchestra, London; Harmonie Royale, Antwerp; Gewerbehaus Orchestra, Dresden; and the Musikforeningen of Bergen (1898–1899).

Between 1898 and 1906 he worked as a musician and conductor in the USA. He was engaged as a cellist with the Theodore Thomas Orchestra in 1899, and worked with the Chicago Symphony Orchestra and Syracuse University. He had a brief and contentious engagement as "second solo" cello (i.e., first cello desk, but second player; Louis Heine was principal cello) with the Pittsburgh Orchestra, the predecessor to the Pittsburgh Symphony, in the 1902–03 season under Victor Herbert. In early 1903 Borch wrote an abusive letter about Herbert to the Art Society of Pittsburgh, the orchestra's sponsor, which found its way into the local newspapers. Herbert publicly responded to Borch's allegations by claiming that the cellist had failed to meet his expectations, and in any event, his comments were colored by the recent notification that his services would not be required for the Orchestra's upcoming Spring tour. In 1901 Borch's patent application for a device to amplify the vibrations from a piano indicates he was living at the time in Duluth, Minnesota. He spent some time in Europe in 1906 as conductor of the Lausanne Symphony Orchestra. He conducted the Grieg Jubilee Concerts in New York in 1907. He was for a time a faculty member of the Pennsylvania College of Music.

Between 1916 and his death Borch was a prolific composer of photoplay music; short, stock pieces designed to evoke a particular mood. These were then selected and combined by musicians to create an appropriate scene-by-scene score for the silent films, or "photoplays", they accompanied live. In 1918 he published his Practical Manual of Instrumentation, a technical manual for musicians which included several chapters on the adaptation of works written for larger orchestras to smaller ensembles, such as those working in picture houses. By 1925 he was sufficiently prominent in the field to be described as one of "the three 'B's' of picture music", along with Maurice Baron and Irénée Bergé—"a formidable trio of expert writers".

In 1920 Borch was reported as attempting to establish a grand opera company in Boston, Massachusetts. Borch returned to Europe in 1921, settling in Sweden, where he was an arranger and musical contributor to the score of The Saga of Gosta Berling (1924), starring Greta Garbo. On 1 January 1925, the first day of radio broadcasting in Sweden, Borch led the Skandia Cinema Orchestra in Sweden's first broadcast of orchestral music.

== Personal life ==
Borch married Rose Alice Gluckauf in July 1900 in St. Paul, Minnesota. His wife was a soprano who had previously taught at the Raff Conservatory in Frankfurt, Germany, and who studied with Julius Stockhausen and Jenny Hahn. She taught music at what is now Millikin University in Decatur, Illinois from 1913 until 1922, when she filed for divorce from her husband on the grounds of desertion and bigamy.

Gaston Borch died in Stockholm in 1926.

== Selected works ==
=== Opera ===
- Silvio (1897), a one-act opera premiered on 7 March 1898, with libretto by Borch and O. A. Smith—a sequel to Cavalleria Rusticana
- Ostenfor Sol, a "fairy opera"
- Geneviève de Paris (1906)

=== Photoplay music ===
- Incidental Symphonies – Used in the scores of The Cat and the Canary (1927) and White Zombie (1932)
- Misterioso Infernale (1916) – "Gruesome" section used in the score of Tarzan's Revenge (1938)
- Poeme Symphonique – Used as the theme for the 1920 silent film Madame X

== Publications ==
- Practical Manual of Instrumentation. The Boston Music Company, 1918.
