= Zombie =

Undead being from Haitian folklore and horror fiction

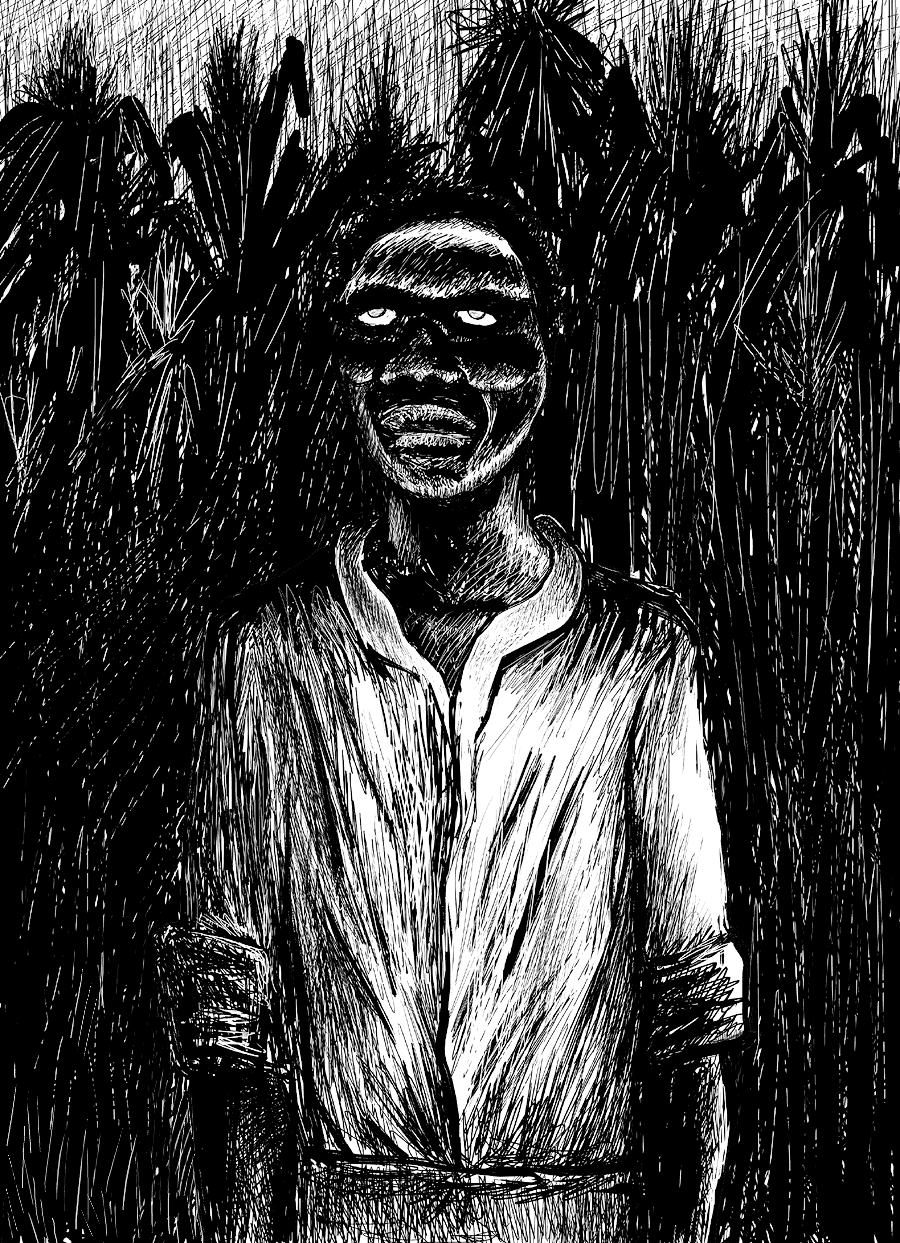
Depiction of a zombie at twilight in a field of sugar cane

A zombie (Haitian French: zombi; Haitian Creole: zonbi; Kikongo: zumbi) is a legendary undead being created through the reanimation of a cadaver, a corporeal manifestation of the revenant type. In modern popular culture, zombies often appear in horror genre works. The term comes from Haitian folklore, in which a zombie is a dead body reanimated through magic by a bokor sorcerer. Modern media depictions of the reanimation of the dead often do not involve magic but rather science fictional methods such as infection, diseases, fungi, radiation, gases, plants, bacteria, viruses, etc.

The English word zombie was first recorded in the 18th century; dictionaries trace its origins to Bantu languages, such as Kimbundu nzumbi 'ghost, spirit'. One of the first books to expose Western culture to the concept of the voodoo zombie was W. B. Seabrook's The Magic Island (1929), which includes a purportedly-true paranormal account of zombies being forced to work on a Haitian sugar plantation.

A new version of the zombie, distinct from that described in Haitian folklore, emerged in popular culture during the latter half of the 20th century. This interpretation of the zombie, as an undead person that attacks and eats the flesh of living people, is drawn largely from George A. Romero's film Night of the Living Dead (1968), which was partly inspired by Richard Matheson's novel I Am Legend (1954). The word zombie is not used in Night of the Living Dead, but was applied later by fans. Following the release of such zombie films as Dawn of the Dead (1978) and The Return of the Living Dead (1985)—the latter of which introduced the concept of zombies that eat brains—as well as Michael Jackson's music video Thriller (1983), the genre waned for some years.

The mid-1990s saw the introduction of Resident Evil and The House of the Dead, two break-out successes of video games featuring zombie enemies which would later go on to become highly influential and well-known. These games were initially followed by a wave of low-budget Asian zombie films such as the zombie comedy Bio Zombie (1998) and action film Versus (2000), and then a new wave of popular Western zombie films in the early 2000s, the Resident Evil and House of the Dead films, the 2004 Dawn of the Dead remake, and the British zombie comedy Shaun of the Dead (2004). The "zombie apocalypse" concept, in which the civilized world is brought low by a global zombie infestation, has since become a staple of modern zombie media, seen in such media as The Walking Dead franchise.

The late 2000s and 2010s saw the humanization and romanticization of the zombie archetype, with the zombies increasingly portrayed as friends and love interests for humans. Notable examples of the latter include movies Warm Bodies and Zombies, novels American Gods by Neil Gaiman, Generation Dead by Daniel Waters, and Bone Song by John Meaney, animated movie Corpse Bride, TV series iZombie and Santa Clarita Diet, manga series Sankarea: Undying Love, and the light novel Is This a Zombie? In this context, zombies are often seen as stand-ins for discriminated groups struggling for equality, and the human–zombie romantic relationship is interpreted as a metaphor for sexual liberation and taboo breaking (given that zombies are subject to wild desires and free from social conventions).

== Etymology ==
In Haitian folklore, a zombie (Haitian French: zombi, Haitian Creole: zonbi) is an animated corpse raised by magical means, such as witchcraft.

The Oxford English Dictionary derives the word from French and a French Creole language, in turn ultimately from Kimbundu nzumbi 'ghost, spirit who torments living people'. The dictionary also names the word nzambi 'god', and terms in the related Kongo language, as potential influences.

How the creatures in contemporary zombie films came to be called "zombies" is not fully clear. The film Night of the Living Dead (1968) made no spoken reference to its undead antagonists as "zombies", describing them instead as "ghouls" (a term for flesh-eating demons derived from Arabic folklore). Although George A. Romero used the term "ghoul" in his original scripts, in later interviews he used the term "zombie". The word "zombie" is used exclusively by Romero in his script for his sequel Dawn of the Dead (1978), including once in dialog. According to Romero, film critics were influential in associating the term "zombie" to his creatures, and especially the French magazine Cahiers du Cinéma. He eventually accepted this linkage, even though he remained convinced at the time that "zombies" corresponded to the undead slaves of Haitian voodoo as depicted in White Zombie with Bela Lugosi.

== Mythological creature ==
=== Folk beliefs ===
==== Haiti ====
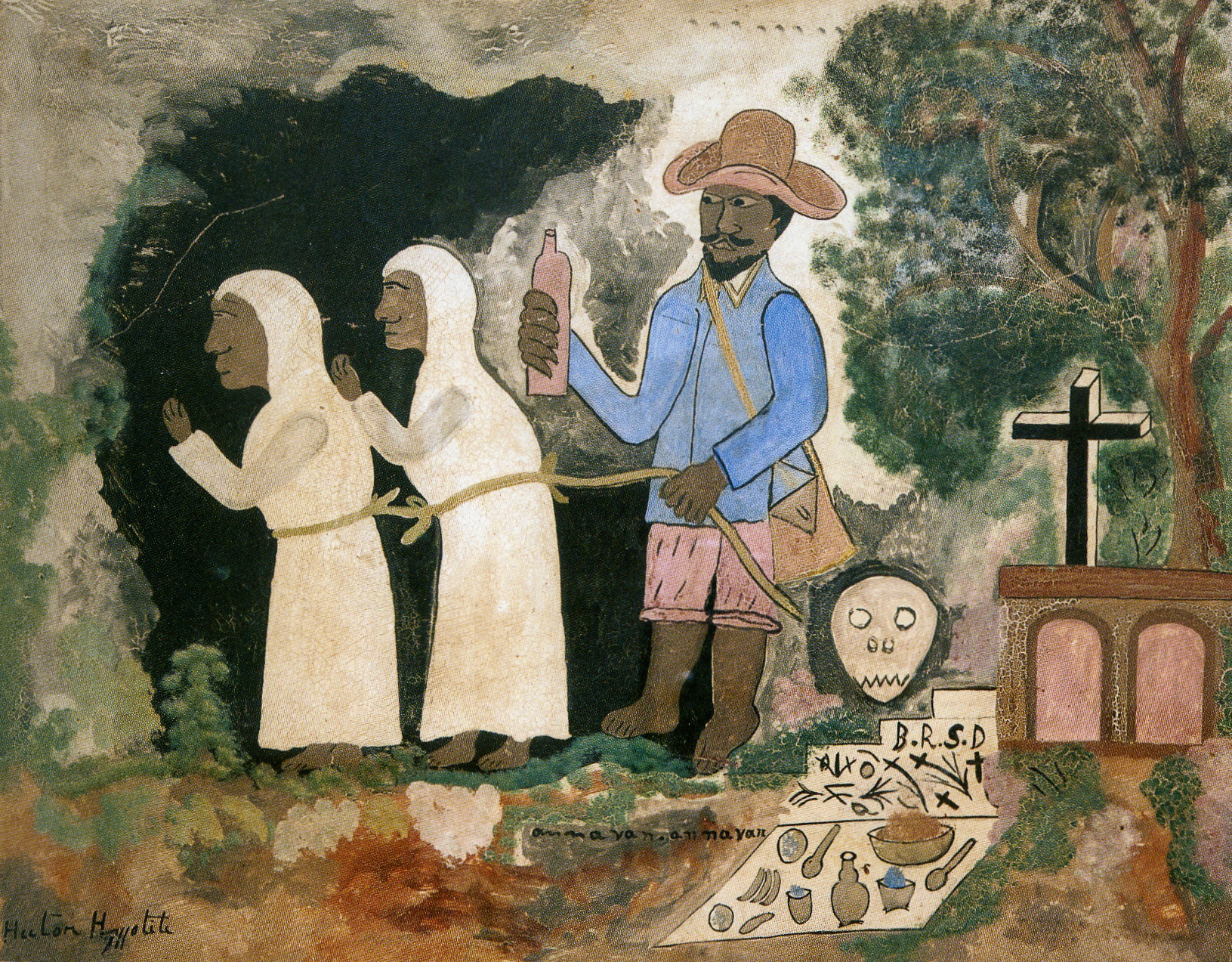
1946 painting by Haitian artist Hector Hyppolite, of a bokor (with Baron Samedi iconography), engaged in body snatching from a cemetery in order to create zombies to serve him

Zombies are featured widely in Haitian rural folklore as dead persons physically revived by the act of necromancy of a bokor, a sorcerer or witch. The bokor is opposed by the houngan (priest) and the mambo (priestess) of the formal voodoo religion. A zombie remains under the control of the bokor as a personal slave, having no will of its own.

The Haitian tradition also includes an incorporeal type of zombie, the "zombie astral", which is a part of the human soul. A bokor can capture a zombie astral to enhance his spiritual power. A zombie astral can also be sealed inside a specially decorated bottle by a bokor and sold to a client to bring luck, healing, or business success. It is believed that God eventually will reclaim the zombie's soul, so the zombie is a temporary spiritual entity.

The two types of zombie reflect soul dualism, a belief of Bakongo religion and Haitian voodoo. Each type of legendary zombie is therefore missing one half of its soul (the flesh or the spirit).

The zombie belief has its roots in traditions brought to Haiti by enslaved Africans and their subsequent experiences in the New World. It was thought that the voodoo deity Baron Samedi would gather them from their grave to bring them to a heavenly afterlife in Africa ("Guinea"), unless they had offended him in some way, in which case they would be forever a slave after death, as a zombie. A zombie could also be saved by feeding them salt. English professor Amy Wilentz has written that the modern concept of zombies was strongly influenced by Haitian slavery. Slave drivers on the plantations, who were usually slaves themselves and sometimes voodoo priests, used the fear of zombification to discourage slaves from committing suicide.

While most scholars have associated the Haitian zombie with African cultures, a connection has also been suggested to the island's indigenous Taíno people, partly based on an early account of native shamanist practices written by Ramón Pané, a monk of the Hieronymite religious order and companion of Christopher Columbus.

The Haitian zombie phenomenon first attracted widespread international attention during the United States occupation of Haiti (1915–1934), when a number of case histories of purported "zombies" began to emerge. The first popular book covering the topic was William Seabrook's The Magic Island (1929), which includes a purported account of zombies working on a plantation of the Haitian American Sugar Company. Seabrooke cited Article 246 of the Haitian criminal code related to poisoning, which was passed in 1864, asserting that it was an official recognition of zombies. This passage was later used in promotional materials for the 1932 film White Zombie.

Also shall be qualified as attempted murder the employment which may be made by any person of substances which, without causing actual death, produce a lethargic coma more or less prolonged. If, after the administering of such substances, the person has been buried, the act shall be considered murder no matter what result follows.

— Code pénal

In 1937, while researching folklore in Haiti, Zora Neale Hurston encountered the case of a woman who appeared in a village. A family claimed that she was Felicia Felix-Mentor, a relative, who had died and been buried in 1907 at the age of 29. The woman was examined by a doctor; X-rays indicated that she did not have a leg fracture that Felix-Mentor was known to have had. Hurston pursued rumors that affected persons were given a powerful psychoactive drug, but she was unable to locate individuals willing to offer much information. She wrote: "What is more, if science ever gets to the bottom of Vodou in Haiti and Africa, it will be found that some important medical secrets, still unknown to medical science, give it its power, rather than gestures of ceremony."

==== Kongo ====
A Central African origin for the Haitian zombie has been postulated based on two etymologies in the Kongo language, nzambi ("god") and zumbi ("fetish"). This root helps form the names of several deities, including the Kongo creator deity Nzambi Ampungu and the Louisiana serpent deity Li Grand Zombi (a local version of the Haitian Damballa), but it is also a generic word for a divine spirit. The common African conception of beings under these names is more similar to the incorporeal "zombie astral", a variant of the Kongo Nkisi spirits.

A related, but also often incorporeal, undead being is the jumbee of the English-speaking Caribbean, considered to be of the same etymology; in the French West Indies also, local "zombies" are recognized, but these are of a more general spirit nature.

==== South Africa ====
The idea of physical zombie-like creatures is present in some South African cultures, where they are called xidachane in Sotho/Tsonga and maduxwane in Venda. In some communities, it is believed that a dead person can be zombified by a small child. It is said that the spell can be broken by a powerful enough sangoma. It is also believed in some areas of South Africa that witches can zombify a person by killing and possessing the victim's body to force it into slave labor. After rail lines were built to transport migrant workers, stories emerged about "witch trains". These trains appeared ordinary, but were staffed by zombified workers controlled by a witch. The trains would abduct a person boarding at night, and the person would then either be zombified or beaten and thrown from the train a distance away from the original location.

=== Origin hypotheses ===
==== Chemical ====
Several decades after Hurston's work, Wade Davis, a Harvard ethnobotanist, presented a pharmacological case for zombies in a 1983 article in the Journal of Ethnopharmacology, and later in two popular books: The Serpent and the Rainbow (1985) and Passage of Darkness: The Ethnobiology of the Haitian Zombie (1988).

Davis traveled to Haiti in 1982 and, as a result of his investigations, claimed that a living person can be turned into a zombie by two special powders being introduced into the bloodstream (usually through a wound). The first, French: coup de poudre ("powder strike"), includes tetrodotoxin (TTX), a powerful and frequently fatal neurotoxin found in the flesh of the pufferfish (family Tetraodontidae). The second powder consists of deliriant drugs such as datura. Together these powders were said to induce a deathlike state, in which the will of the victim would be entirely subjected to that of the bokor. Davis also popularized the story of Clairvius Narcisse, who was claimed to have succumbed to this practice. The most ethically questioned and least scientifically explored ingredient of the powders is part of a recently buried child's brain.

The process described by Davis was an initial state of deathlike suspended animation, followed by re-awakening – typically after being buried – into a psychotic state. The psychosis induced by the drug and psychological trauma was hypothesised by Davis to reinforce culturally learned beliefs and to cause the individual to reconstruct their identity as that of a zombie, since they "knew" that they were dead and had no other role to play in the Haitian society. Societal reinforcement of the belief was hypothesized by Davis to confirm for the zombie individual the zombie state, and such individuals were known to hang around in graveyards, exhibiting attitudes of low affect.

Davis's claim has been criticized, particularly the suggestion that Haitian witch doctors can keep "zombies" in a state of pharmacologically induced trance for many years. Symptoms of TTX poisoning range from numbness and nausea to paralysis – particularly of the muscles of the diaphragm – unconsciousness, and death, but do not include a stiffened gait or a deathlike trance. According to psychologist Terence Hines, Davis assessment of the nature of the reports of Haitian zombies is 'overly credulous'.

==== Social ====
Scottish psychiatrist R. D. Laing highlighted the link between social and cultural expectations and compulsion, in the context of schizophrenia and other mental illness, suggesting that schizogenesis may account for some of the psychological aspects of zombification. Particularly, this suggests cases where schizophrenia manifests a state of catatonia.

Roland Littlewood, professor of anthropology and psychiatry, published a study supporting a social explanation of the zombie phenomenon in the medical journal The Lancet in 1997. The social explanation sees observed cases of people identified as zombies as a culture-bound syndrome, with a particular cultural form of adoption practiced in Haiti that unites the homeless and mentally ill with grieving families who see them as their "returned" lost loved ones, as Littlewood summarizes his findings in an article in Times Higher Education:

I came to the conclusion that although it is unlikely that there is a single explanation for all cases where zombies are recognised by locals in Haiti, the mistaken identification of a wandering mentally ill stranger by bereaved relatives is the most likely explanation in many cases. People with a chronic schizophrenic illness, brain damage or learning disability are not uncommon in rural Haiti, and they would be particularly likely to be identified as zombies.

== Modern archetype evolution ==
=== Historical influences ===
Pulliam and Fonseca (2014) and Walz (2006) trace the flesh-eating zombie lineage back to ancient Mesopotamia. In the Descent of Ishtar, the goddess Ishtar threatens:

If you do not open the gate for me to come in,
I shall smash the door and shatter the bolt,
I shall smash the doorpost and overturn the doors,
I shall raise up the dead and they shall eat the living:
And the dead shall outnumber the living!

She repeats this same threat in a slightly modified form in the Epic of Gilgamesh.

One of the first books to expose Western culture to the concept of the voodoo zombie was The Magic Island (1929) by W. B. Seabrook. This is the sensationalized account of a narrator who encounters voodoo cults in Haiti and their resurrected thralls. Time commented that the book "introduced 'zombi' into U.S. speech". Zombies have a complex literary heritage, with antecedents ranging from Richard Matheson and H. P. Lovecraft to Mary Shelley's Frankenstein drawing on European folklore of the undead. Victor Halperin directed White Zombie (1932), a horror film starring Bela Lugosi. Here zombies are depicted as mindless, unthinking henchmen under the spell of an evil magician. Zombies, often still using this voodoo-inspired rationale, were initially uncommon in cinema, but their appearances continued sporadically through the 1930s to the 1960s, with films including I Walked with a Zombie (1943) and Plan 9 from Outer Space (1959).

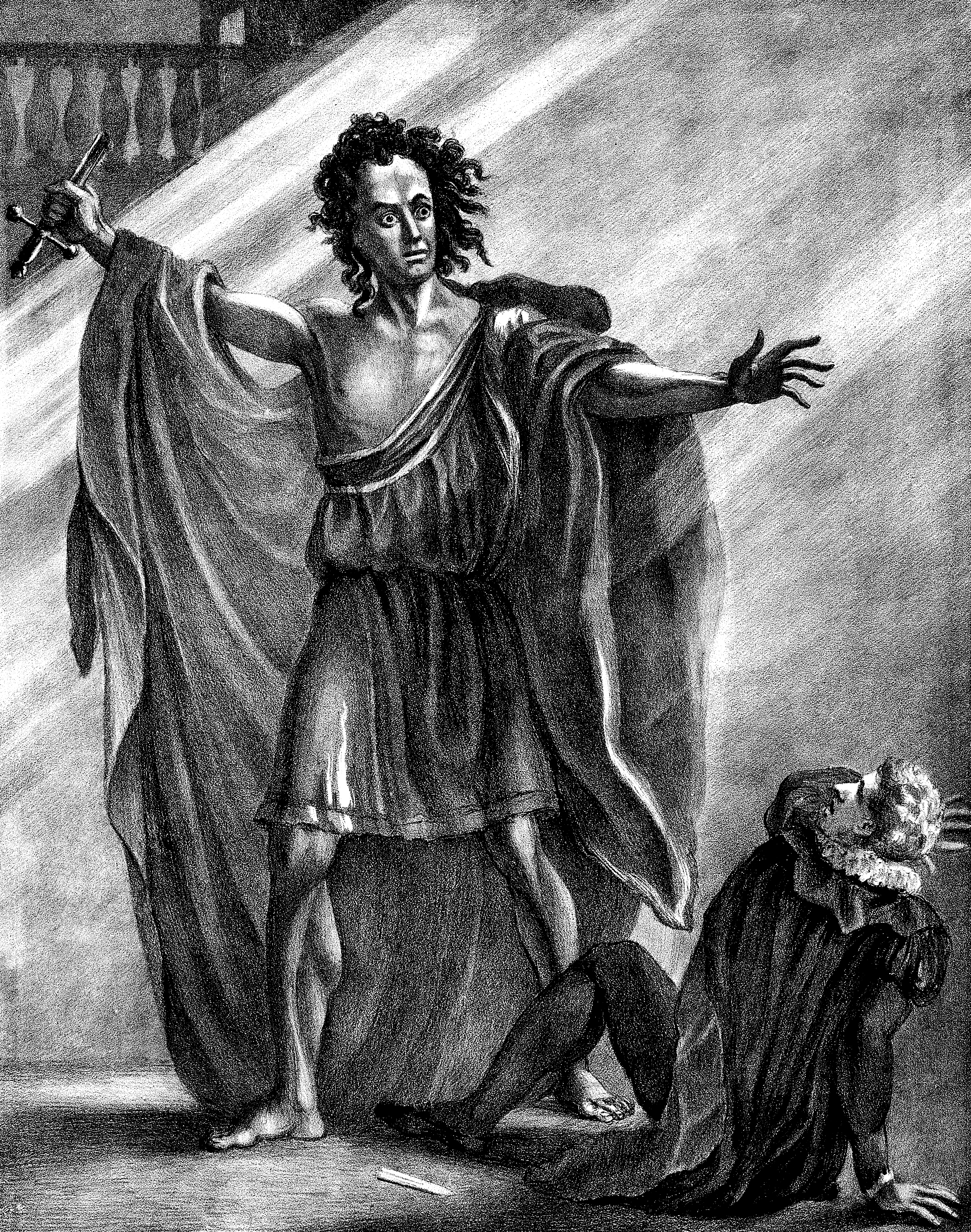
The actor T. P. Cooke as Frankenstein's Monster in an 1823 stage production of the novel

Frankenstein by Mary Shelley, while not a zombie novel per se, foreshadows many 20th century ideas about zombies in that the resurrection of the dead is portrayed as a scientific process rather than a mystical one and that the resurrected dead are degraded and more violent than their living selves. Frankenstein, published in 1818, has its roots in European folklore, whose tales of the vengeful dead also informed the evolution of the modern conception of the vampire. Later notable 19th century stories about the avenging undead included Ambrose Bierce's "The Death of Halpin Frayser" and various Gothic Romanticism tales by Edgar Allan Poe. Though their works could not be properly considered zombie fiction, the supernatural tales of Bierce and Poe would prove influential on later writers such as H. P. Lovecraft, by Lovecraft's own admission.

In the 1920s and early 1930s, Lovecraft wrote several novellae that explored the undead theme. "Cool Air", "In the Vault" and "The Outsider" all deal with the undead, but Lovecraft's "Herbert West–Reanimator" (1921) "helped define zombies in popular culture". This series of short stories featured Herbert West, a mad scientist, who attempts to revive human corpses, with mixed results. Notably, the resurrected dead are uncontrollable, mostly mute, primitive and extremely violent; though they are not referred to as zombies, their portrayal was prescient, anticipating the modern conception of zombies by several decades. Edgar Rice Burroughs similarly depicted animated corpses in the second book of his Venus series, again without using the terms "zombie" or "undead".

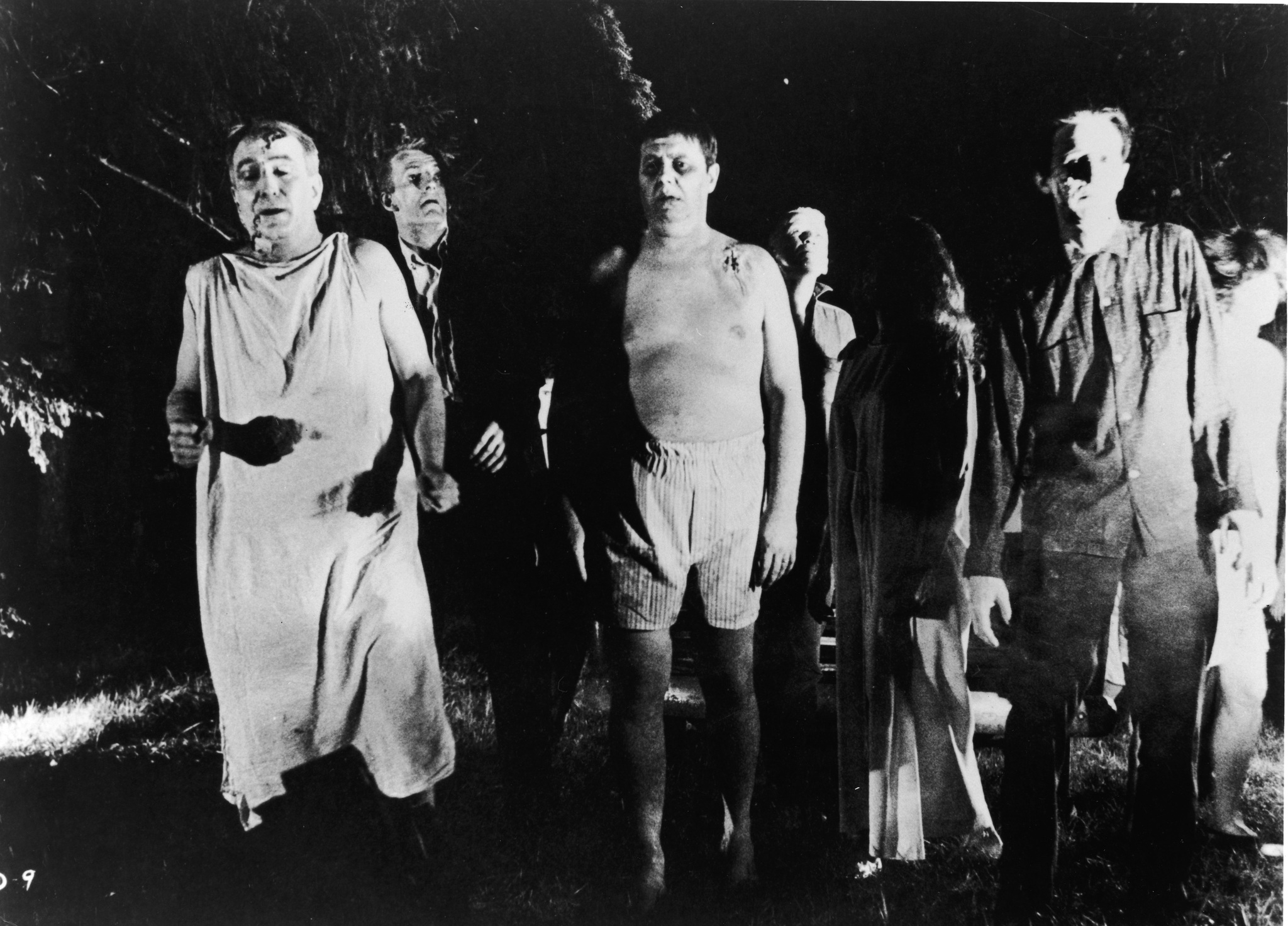
George A. Romero's Night of the Living Dead (1968) is considered a progenitor of the fictional zombie of modern culture.

Avenging zombies would feature prominently in the early 1950s EC Comics, which George A. Romero would later claim as an influence. The comics, including Tales from the Crypt, The Vault of Horror and Weird Science, featured avenging undead in the Gothic tradition quite regularly, including adaptations of Lovecraft's stories, which included "In the Vault", "Cool Air" and "Herbert West–Reanimator".

Richard Matheson's 1954 novel I Am Legend, although classified as a vampire story, had a great impact on the zombie genre by way of George A. Romero. The novel and its 1964 film adaptation, The Last Man on Earth, which concern a lone human survivor waging war against a world of vampires, would by Romero's own admission greatly influence his 1968 low-budget film Night of the Living Dead, a work that was more influential on the concept of zombies than any literary or cinematic work before it. The monsters in the film and its sequels, such as Dawn of the Dead (1978) and Day of the Dead (1985), as well as the many zombie films it inspired, such as The Return of the Living Dead (1985) and Zombi 2 (1979), are usually hungry for human flesh, although Return of the Living Dead introduced the popular concept of zombies eating human brains.

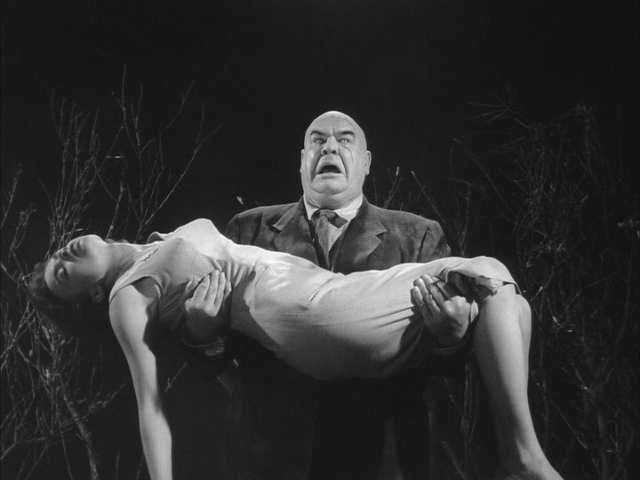
Tor Johnson as a zombie with his victim in the cult movie Plan 9 from Outer Space (1959)

There has been an evolution in the zombie archetype from supernatural to scientific themes. I Am Legend and Night of the Living Dead began the shift away from Haitian dark magic, though did not give scientific explanations for zombie origins. A more decisive shift towards scientific themes came with the Resident Evil video game series in the late 1990s, which gave more realistic scientific explanations for zombie origins while drawing on modern science and technology, such as biological weaponry, genetic manipulation, and parasitic symbiosis. This became the standard approach for explaining zombie origins in popular fiction that followed Resident Evil.

There has also been shift towards an action approach, which has led to another evolution of the zombie archetype, the "fast zombie" or running zombie. In contrast to Romero's classic slow zombies, "fast zombies" can run, are more aggressive and are often more intelligent. This type of zombie has origins in 1990s Japanese horror video games. In 1996, Capcom's survival horror video game Resident Evil featured zombie dogs that run towards the player. Later the same year, Sega's arcade shooter The House of the Dead introduced running human zombies, who run towards the player and can also jump and swim. The running human zombies introduced in The House of the Dead video games became the basis for the "fast zombies" that became popular in zombie films during the early 21st century, starting with 28 Days Later (2002), the Resident Evil and House of the Dead films and the 2004 Dawn of the Dead remake. These films also adopted an action approach to the zombie concept, which was also influenced by the Resident Evil and House of the Dead video games.

=== Apocalypse ===
Intimately tied to the concept of the modern zombie is that of the "zombie apocalypse": the breakdown of society as a result of an initial zombie outbreak that spreads quickly. This archetype has emerged as a prolific subgenre of apocalyptic fiction and has been portrayed in many zombie-related media after Night of the Living Dead. In a zombie apocalypse, a widespread (usually global) rise of zombies hostile to human life engages in a general assault on civilization. Victims of zombies may become zombies themselves. This causes the outbreak to become an exponentially growing crisis: the spreading phenomenon swamps normal military and law-enforcement organizations, leading to the panicked collapse of civilized society until only isolated pockets of survivors remain, scavenging for food and supplies in a world reduced to a pre-industrial hostile wilderness. Possible causes for zombie behavior in a modern population can be attributed to viruses, bacteria or other phenomena that reduce the mental capacity of humans, causing them to behave in a very primitive and destructive fashion.

==== Subtext ====
The usual subtext of the zombie apocalypse is that civilization is inherently vulnerable to the unexpected, and that most individuals, if desperate enough, cannot be relied on to comply with the author's ethos. The narrative of a zombie apocalypse carries strong connections to the turbulent social landscape of the United States in the 1960s, when Night of the Living Dead provided an indirect commentary on the dangers of conformity, a theme also explored in the novel The Body Snatchers (1954) and associated film Invasion of the Body Snatchers (1956). Many also feel that zombies allow people to deal with their own anxieties about the end of the world. One scholar concluded that "more than any other monster, zombies are fully and literally apocalyptic ... they signal the end of the world as we have known it". While zombie apocalypse scenarios are secular, they follow a religious pattern based on Christian ideas of an end-times war and messiah.

Simon Pegg, who starred in and co-wrote the 2004 zombie comedy film Shaun of the Dead, wrote that zombies were the "most potent metaphorical monster". According to Pegg, whereas vampires represent sex, zombies represent death: "Slow and steady in their approach, weak, clumsy, often absurd, the zombie relentlessly closes in, unstoppable, intractable." He expressed his dislike for the trend for fast zombies, and argued that they should be slow and inept; just as a healthy diet and exercise can delay death, zombies are easy to avoid, but not forever. He also argued that this was essential for making them "oddly sympathetic... to create tragic anti-heroes... to be pitied, empathised with, even rooted for. The moment they appear angry or petulant, the second they emit furious velociraptor screeches (as opposed to the correct mournful moans of longing), they cease to possess any ambiguity. They are simply mean."

==== Story elements ====
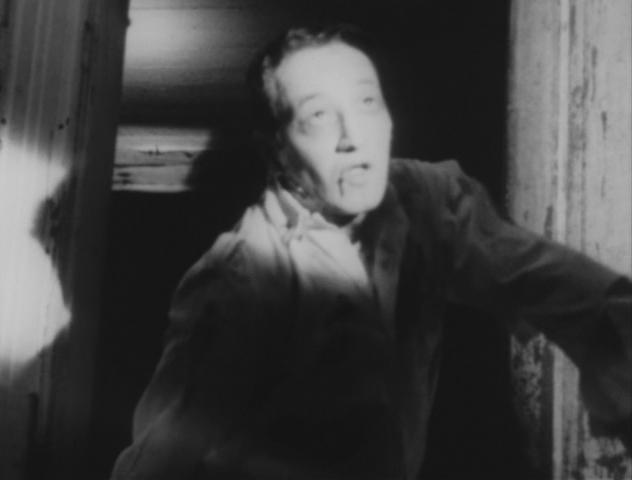
John A. Russo portrays a zombie in Night of the Living Dead.

1. Initial contacts with zombies are extremely dangerous and traumatic, causing shock, panic, disbelief and possibly denial, hampering survivors' ability to deal with hostile encounters.
2. The response of authorities to the threat is slower than its rate of growth, giving the zombie plague time to expand beyond containment. This results in the collapse of the given society. Zombies take full control, while small groups of the living must fight for their survival.

The stories usually follow a single group of survivors, caught up in the sudden rush of the crisis. The narrative generally progresses from the onset of the zombie plague, then initial attempts to seek the aid of authorities, the failure of those authorities, through to the sudden catastrophic collapse of all large-scale organization and the characters' subsequent attempts to survive on their own. Such stories are often squarely focused on the way their characters react to such an extreme catastrophe, and how their personalities are changed by the stress, often acting on more primal motivations (fear, self-preservation) than they would display in normal life.

== Depictions in popular culture ==
=== Film and television ===
Films featuring zombies have been a part of cinema since the 1930s. White Zombie (directed by Victor Halperin in 1932) and I Walked with a Zombie (directed by Jacques Tourneur; 1943) were early serious examples, and Bob Hope's The Ghost Breakers (directed by George Marshall in 1940) being an early comedic take on the zombie genre. With George A. Romero's Night of the Living Dead (1968), the zombie trope began to be increasingly linked to consumerism and consumer culture. Today, zombie films are released with such regularity (at least 50 films were released in 2014 alone) that they constitute a separate subgenre of horror film.

Voodoo-related zombie themes have also appeared in espionage or adventure-themed works outside the horror genre. For example, the original Jonny Quest series (1964) and the James Bond novel Live and Let Die as well as its film adaptation both feature Caribbean villains who falsely claim the voodoo power of zombification to keep others in fear of them.

Romero's modern zombie archetype in Night of the Living Dead was influenced by several earlier zombie-themed films, including White Zombie, Revolt of the Zombies (1936) and The Plague of the Zombies (1966). Romero was also inspired by Richard Matheson's novel I Am Legend (1954), along with its film adaptation, The Last Man on Earth (1964).

==== George A. Romero (1968–1985) ====
The modern conception of the zombie owes itself almost entirely to George A. Romero's 1968 film Night of the Living Dead. In his films, Romero "bred the zombie with the vampire, and what he got was the hybrid vigour of a ghoulish plague monster". This entailed an apocalyptic vision of monsters that have come to be known as Romero zombies.

Roger Ebert of the Chicago Sun-Times chided theater owners and parents who allowed children access to the film. "I don't think the younger kids really knew what hit them", complained Ebert, "They were used to going to movies, sure, and they'd seen some horror movies before, sure, but this was something else." According to Ebert, the film affected the audience immediately:

The kids in the audience were stunned. There was almost complete silence. The movie had stopped being delightfully scary about halfway through, and had become unexpectedly terrifying. There was a little girl across the aisle from me, maybe nine years old, who was sitting very still in her seat and crying.

Romero's reinvention of zombies is notable in terms of its thematics; he used zombies not just for their own sake, but as a vehicle "to criticize real-world social ills—such as government ineptitude, bioengineering, slavery, greed and exploitation—while indulging our post-apocalyptic fantasies". Night was the first of six films in Romero's Living Dead series. Its first sequel, Dawn of the Dead, was released in 1978.

Lucio Fulci's Zombi 2 was released just months after Dawn of the Dead as an ersatz sequel (Dawn of the Dead was released in several other countries as Zombi or Zombie). Dawn of the Dead was the most commercially successful zombie film for decades, up until the zombie revival of the 2000s. The 1981 film Hell of the Living Dead referenced a mutagenic gas as a source of zombie contagion: an idea also used in Dan O'Bannon's 1985 film Return of the Living Dead. Return of the Living Dead featured zombies that hungered specifically for human brains.

==== Relative Western decline (1985–1995) ====
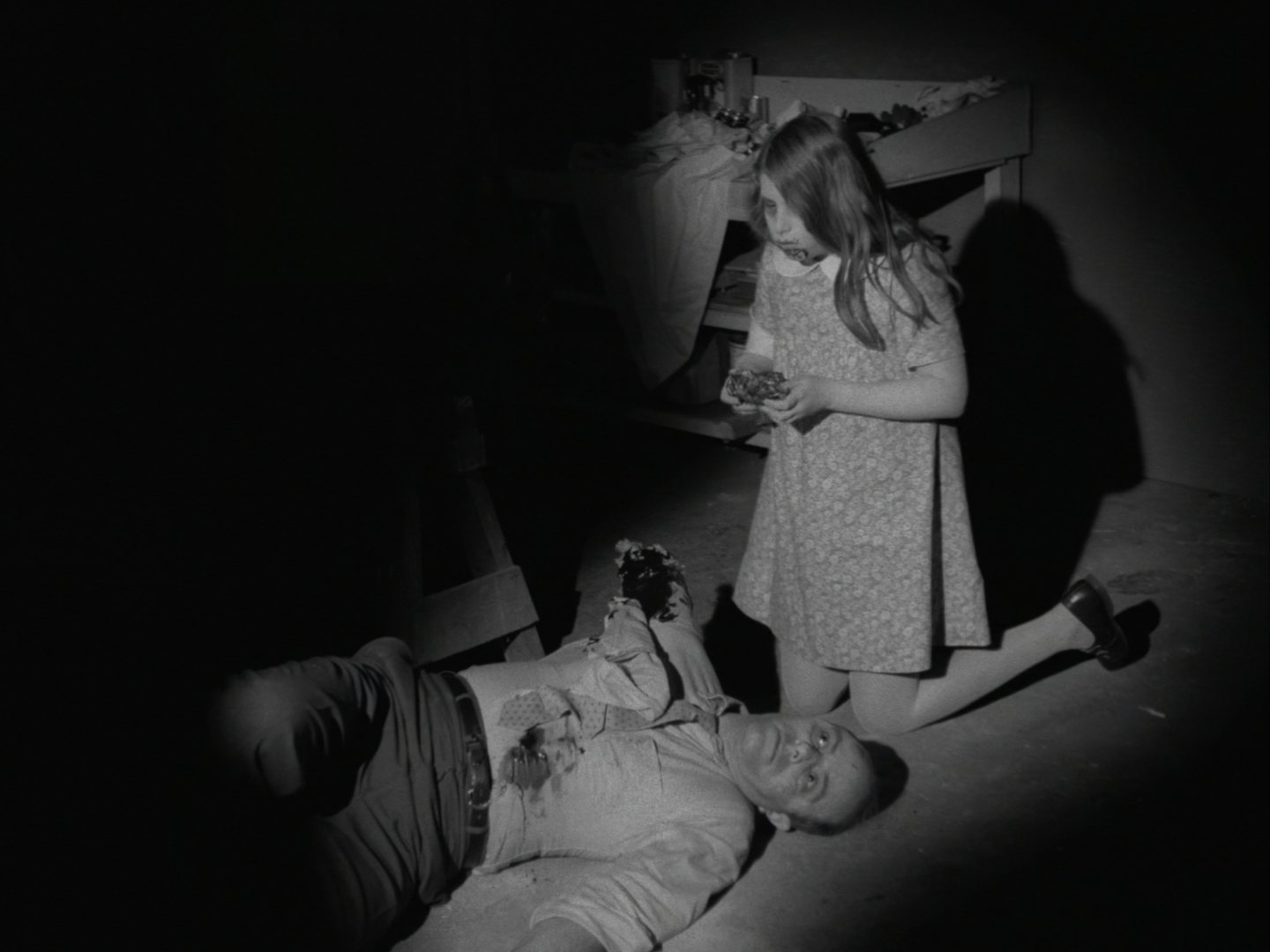
A young zombie (Kyra Schon) feeding on human flesh, from Night of the Living Dead (1968)

Zombie films in the 1980s and 1990s were not as commercially successful as Dawn of the Dead in the late 1970s. The mid-1980s produced few zombie films of note. Perhaps the most notable entry, the Evil Dead trilogy, while highly influential, are not technically zombie films, but films about demonic possession, despite the presence of the undead. 1985's Re-Animator, loosely based on the Lovecraft story, stood out in the genre, achieving nearly unanimous critical acclaim and becoming a modest success, nearly outstripping Romero's Day of the Dead for box office returns.

After the mid-1980s, the subgenre was mostly relegated to the underground. Notable entries include director Peter Jackson's ultra-gory film Braindead (1992) (released as Dead Alive in the U.S.), Bob Balaban's comic 1993 film My Boyfriend's Back, where a self-aware high-school boy returns to profess his love for a girl and his love for human flesh, and Michele Soavi's Dellamorte Dellamore (1994) (released as Cemetery Man in the U.S.).

==== Early Asian films (1985–1995) ====
In 1980s Hong Kong cinema, the Chinese jiangshi, a zombie-like creature dating back to Qing dynasty era jiangshi fiction of the 18th and 19th centuries, were featured in a wave of jiangshi films, popularised by Mr. Vampire (1985). Hong Kong jiangshi films were popular in the Far East from the mid-1980s to the early 1990s.

Prior to the 1990s, there were not many Japanese films related to what may be considered in the West as a zombie film. Early films such as The Discarnates (1988) feature little gore and no cannibalism, but it is about the dead returning to life looking for love rather than a story of apocalyptic destruction. One of the earliest Japanese zombie films with considerable gore and violence was Battle Girl: The Living Dead in Tokyo Bay (1991).

==== Far East revival (1996–2001) ====
According to Kim Newman in the book Nightmare Movies (2011), the "zombie revival began in the Far East" during the late 1990s, largely inspired by two Japanese zombie games released in 1996: Capcom's Resident Evil, which started the Resident Evil video game series that went on to sell 24 million copies worldwide by 2006, and Sega's arcade shooter House of the Dead. The success of these two 1996 zombie games inspired a wave of Asian zombie films. From the late 1990s, zombies experienced a renaissance in low-budget Asian cinema, with a sudden spate of dissimilar entries, including Bio Zombie (1998), Wild Zero (1999), Junk (1999), Versus (2000) and Stacy (2001).

Most Japanese zombie films emerged in the wake of Resident Evil, such as Versus, Wild Zero, and Junk, all from 2000. The zombie films released after Resident Evil behaved similarly to the zombie films of the 1970s, except that they were influenced by zombie video games, which inspired them to dwell more on the action compared to the older Romero films.

==== Global film revival (2001–2008) ====
The zombie revival, which began in the Far East, eventually went global, following the worldwide success of the Japanese zombie games Resident Evil and The House of the Dead. Resident Evil in particular sparked a revival of the zombie genre in popular culture, leading to a renewed global interest in zombie films during the early 2000s. In addition to being adapted into the Resident Evil and House of the Dead films from 2002 onwards, the original video games themselves also inspired zombie films such as 28 Days Later (2002), Planet Terror (2007) and Shaun of the Dead (2004). This led to the revival of zombie films in global popular culture.

The turn of the millennium coincided with a decade of box office successes in which the zombie subgenre experienced a resurgence: the Resident Evil movies (2002–2016), the British films 28 Days Later and 28 Weeks Later (2007), the Dawn of the Dead remake (2004), and the comedies Shaun of the Dead and Dance of the Dead (2008). The new interest allowed Romero to create the fourth entry in his zombie series: Land of the Dead, released in the summer of 2005. Romero returned to the series with the films Diary of the Dead (2008) and Survival of the Dead (2010). Generally, the zombies in these shows are the slow, lumbering and unintelligent kind, first made popular in Night of the Living Dead. The Resident Evil films, 28 Days Later and the Dawn of the Dead remake all set box office records for the zombie genre, reaching levels of commercial success not seen since the original Dawn of the Dead in 1978.

Motion pictures created in the 2000s, like 28 Days Later, the House of the Dead and Resident Evil films, and the Dawn of the Dead remake, have featured zombies that are more agile, vicious, intelligent, and stronger than the traditional zombie. These new type of zombies, the fast zombie or running zombie, have origins in video games, with Resident Evil's running zombie dogs and especially The House of the Dead game's running human zombies.

==== Spillover to television (2008–2015) ====
The success of Shaun of the Dead led to more successful zombie comedies during the late 2000s to early 2010s, such as Zombieland (2009) and Cockneys vs Zombies (2012). By 2011, the Resident Evil film adaptations had also become the highest-grossing film series based on video games, after they grossed more than $1 billion worldwide. In 2013, the AMC series The Walking Dead had the highest audience ratings in the United States for any show on broadcast or cable with an average of 5.6 million viewers in the 18- to 49-year-old demographic. The film World War Z became the highest-grossing zombie film, and one of the highest-grossing films of 2013.

At the same time, starting from the mid-2000s, a new type of zombie film has been growing in popularity: the one in which zombies are portrayed as humanlike in appearance and behavior, retaining the personality traits they had in life, and becoming friends or even romantic partners for humans rather than a threat to humanity. Notable examples of human–zombie romance include the stop-motion animated movie Corpse Bride, live-action movies Warm Bodies, Camille, Life After Beth, Burying the Ex, and Nina Forever, and TV series Pushing Daisies and Babylon Fields. According to zombie scholar Scott Rogers, "what we are seeing in Pushing Daisies, Warm Bodies, and iZombie is in many ways the same transformation [of the zombies] that we have witnessed with vampires since the 1931 Dracula represented Dracula as essentially human—a significant departure from the monstrous representation in the 1922 film Nosferatu". Rogers also notes the accompanying visual transformation of the living dead: while the "traditional" zombies are marked by noticeable disfigurement and decomposition, the "romantic" zombies show little or no such traits.

==== Return to decline (2015–present) ====
In the late 2010s, zombie films began declining in popularity, with elevated horror films gradually taking their place, such as The Witch (2015), Get Out (2017), A Quiet Place (2018) and Hereditary (2018). An exception is the low-budget Japanese zombie comedy One Cut of the Dead (2017), which became a sleeper hit in Japan, and it made box office history by earning over a thousand times its budget. One Cut of the Dead also received worldwide acclaim, with Rotten Tomatoes stating that it "reanimates the moribund zombie genre with a refreshing blend of formal daring and clever satire". Other examples of this exception for the genre would include the Korean zombie film series Train to Busan and Alive (2020), and the Korean webtoon series All of Us Are Dead (2022). The "romantic zombie" angle still remains popular, however: the late 2010s and early 2020s saw the release of the TV series American Gods, iZombie, and Santa Clarita Diet, as well as the 2018 Disney Channel Original Movie Zombies and sequels Zombies 2 (2020), Zombies 3 (2022) and Zombies 4: Dawn of the Vampires (2025). The zombie apocalypse film genre is seen as having undergone a bit of renewal in popularity worldwide in recent years thanks to the success of zombie-related media like HBO's The Last of Us and 28 Years Later.

=== Literature ===
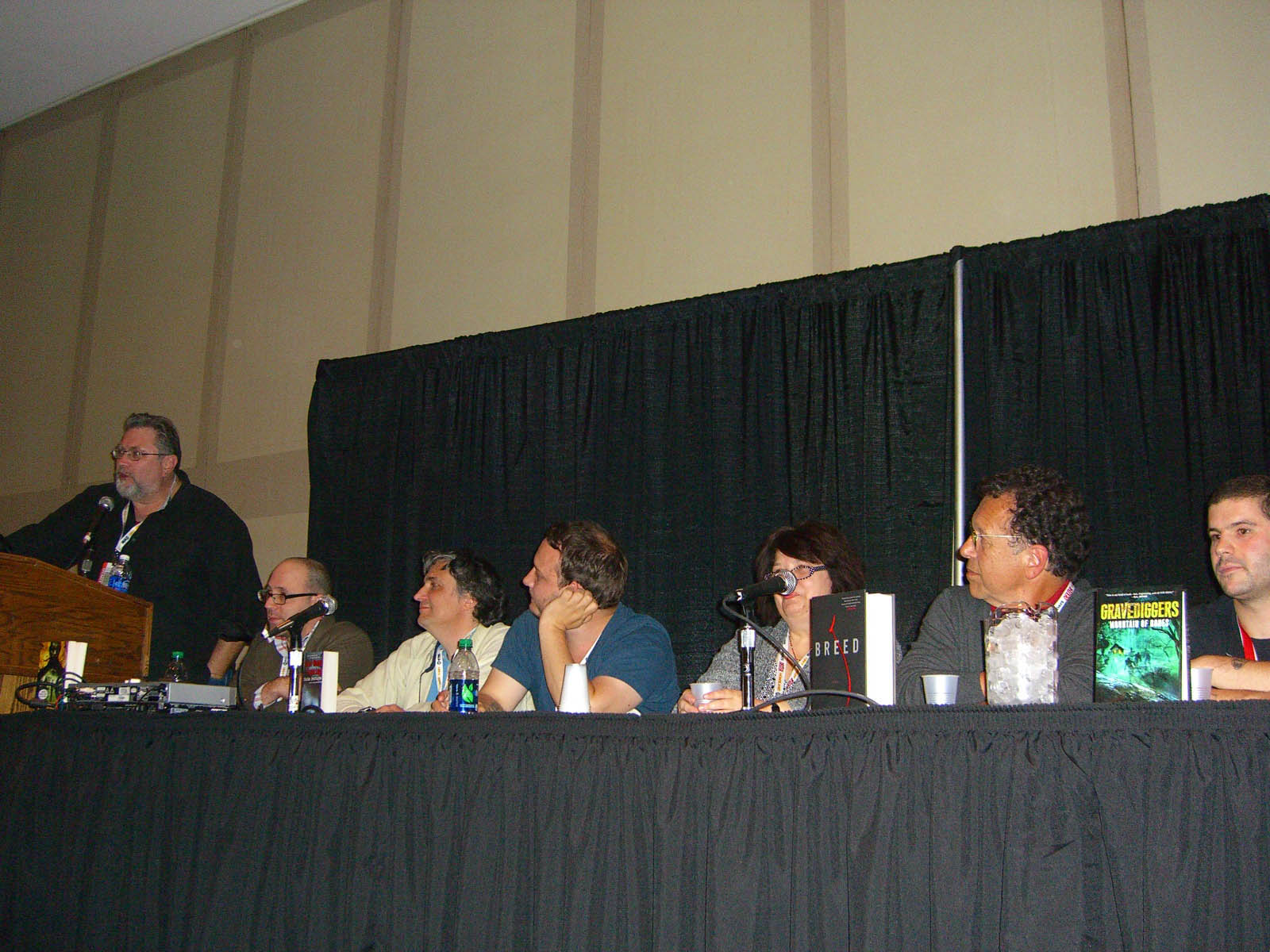
One of the various zombie panel discussion at the 2012 New York Comic Con, featuring writers who have worked in the genre (left to right): Jonathan Maberry, Daniel Kraus, Stefan Petrucha, Will Hill, Rachel Caine, Chase Novak, and Christopher Krovatin. Also present (but not visible in the photo) was Barry Lyga.

In the 1990s, zombie fiction emerged as a distinct literary subgenre, with the publication of Book of the Dead (1990) and its follow-up Still Dead: Book of the Dead 2 (1992), both edited by horror authors John Skipp and Craig Spector. Featuring Romero-inspired stories from the likes of Stephen King, the Book of the Dead compilations are regarded as influential in the horror genre and perhaps the first true "zombie literature". Horror novelist Stephen King has written about zombies, including his short story "Home Delivery" (1990) and his novel Cell (2006), concerning a struggling young artist on a trek from Boston to Maine in hopes of saving his family from a possible worldwide outbreak of zombie-like maniacs.

Max Brooks's novel World War Z (2006) became a New York Times bestseller. Brooks had previously authored The Zombie Survival Guide (2003), a zombie-themed parody of pop-fiction survival guides. Brooks has said that zombies are so popular because "Other monsters may threaten individual humans, but the living dead threaten the entire human race...Zombies are slate wipers." Seth Grahame-Smith's mashup novel Pride and Prejudice and Zombies (2009) combines the full text of Jane Austen's Pride and Prejudice (1813) with a story about a zombie epidemic within the novel's British Regency period setting. In 2009, Katy Hershbereger of St. Martin's Press stated: "In the world of traditional horror, nothing is more popular right now than zombies...The living dead are here to stay."

The 2000s and 2010s were marked by a decidedly new type of zombie novel, in which zombies retain their humanity and become friends or even romantic partners for humans; critics largely attribute this trend to the influence of Stephenie Meyer's vampire series Twilight. One of the most prominent examples is Generation Dead by Daniel Waters, featuring undead teenagers struggling for equality with the living and a human protagonist falling in love with their leader. Other novels of this period involving human–zombie romantic relationships include Bone Song by John Meaney, American Gods by Neil Gaiman, Midnight Tides by Steven Erikson, and Amy Plum's Die for Me series; much earlier examples, dating back to the 1980s, are Dragon on a Pedestal by Piers Anthony and Conan the Defiant by Steve Perry.

=== Anime and manga ===
There has been a growth in the number of zombie manga in the first decade of the 21st century, and in a list of "10 Great Zombie Manga", Anime News Network's Jason Thompson placed I Am a Hero at number 1, considering it "probably the greatest zombie manga ever". In second place was Living Corpse, and in third was Biomega, which he called "the greatest science-fiction virus zombie manga ever". During the late 2000s and early 2010s, there were several manga and anime series that humanized zombies by presenting them as protagonists or love interests, such as Sankarea: Undying Love and Is This a Zombie? (both debuted in 2009).

Z ~Zed~ was adapted into a live action film in 2014.

=== Games ===
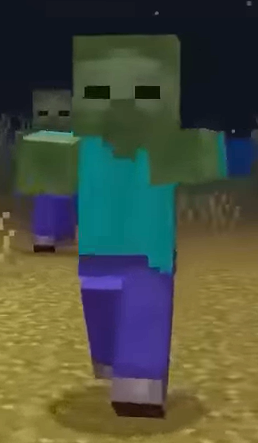
A zombie in Minecraft

Within fantasy role-playing games, the zombie is a common type of undead creature. In Dungeons & Dragons, the zombie, one of the basic undead creature types, combines ideas from contemporary entertainment and traditional folklore. Zombies are generally portrayed as supernatural creations, with variations such as the Ju-ju, Sea Zombie, and Zombie Lord. However, in Advanced Dungeons & Dragons 2nd Edition, another creature (called the Yellow Musk Creeper) was also incorporated. The Yellow Musk Creeper is a creeping plant that drains the intelligence of its victims, turning them into "zombies" under the plant's control. Ben Woodard found this to be an expression of the "seemingly endless morphology of fungal creep and toxicological capacity" within the game.

In video games, the release of two 1996 horror games Capcom's Resident Evil and Sega's The House of the Dead sparked an international craze for zombie games. In 2013, George A. Romero said that it was the video games Resident Evil and House of the Dead "more than anything else" that popularised zombies in early 21st century popular culture. The modern fast-running zombies have origins in these games, with Resident Evil's running zombie dogs and especially House of the Dead's running human zombies, which later became a staple of modern zombie films.

Zombies went on to become a popular theme for video games, particularly in the survival horror, stealth, first-person shooter and role-playing game genres. Important horror fiction media franchises in this area include Resident Evil, The House of the Dead, Silent Hill, Dead Rising, Dead Island, Left 4 Dead, Dying Light, State of Decay, The Last of Us and the Zombies game modes from the Call of Duty title series. A series of games has also been released based on the widely popular TV show The Walking Dead, first aired in 2010. World of Warcraft, first released in 2004, is an early example of a video game in which an individual zombie-like creature could be chosen as a player character (a previous game in the same series, Warcraft III, allowed a player control over an undead army).

PopCap Games' Plants vs. Zombies, a humorous tower defense game, was an indie hit in 2009, featuring in several best-of lists at the end of that year. The massively multiplayer online role-playing game Urban Dead, a free grid-based browser game where zombies and survivors fight for control of a ruined city, is one of the most popular games of its type.

DayZ, a zombie-based survival horror mod for ARMA 2, was responsible for over 300,000 unit sales of its parent game within two months of its release. Over a year later, the developers of the mod created a standalone version of the same game, which was in early access on Steam, and so far has sold 3 million copies since its release in December 2013.

Romero would later opine that he believes that much of the 21st century obsessions with zombies can be traced more towards video games than films, noting that it was not until the 2009 film Zombieland that a zombie film was able to gross more than 100 million dollars.

Outside of video games, zombies frequently appear in trading card games, such as Magic: The Gathering or Yu-Gi-Oh! Trading Card Game (which even has a Zombie-Type for its "monsters"), as well as in role-playing games, such as Dungeons & Dragons, tabletop games such as Zombies!!! and Dead of Winter: A Cross Roads Game, and tabletop wargames, such as Warhammer Fantasy and 40K. The game Humans vs. Zombies is a zombie-themed live-action game played on college campuses.

Writing for Scientific American, Kyle Hill praised the 2013 game The Last of Us for its plausibility, basing its zombification process on a fictional strain of the parasitic Cordyceps fungus, a real-world genus whose members control the behavior of their arthropod hosts in "zombielike" ways to reproduce. Despite the plausibility of this mechanism (also explored in the novel The Girl with All the Gifts and the film of the same name), to date there have been no documented cases of humans infected by Cordyceps.

Zombie video games have remained popular in the late 2010s, as seen with the commercial success of the Resident Evil 2 remake and Days Gone in 2019. This enduring popularity may be attributed, in part, to the fact that zombie enemies are not expected to exhibit significant levels of intelligence, making them relatively straightforward to program. However, less pragmatic advantages, such as those related to storytelling and representation, are increasingly important.

=== Music ===
Michael Jackson's music video Thriller (1983), in which he dances with a troupe of zombies, has been preserved as a cultural treasure by the Library of Congress' National Film Registry. Many instances of pop culture media have paid tribute to this video, including a gathering of 14,000 university students dressed as zombies in Mexico City, and 1,500 prisoners in orange jumpsuits recreating the zombie dance in a viral video.

The Brooklyn hip hop trio Flatbush Zombies incorporate many tropes from zombie fiction and play on the theme of a zombie apocalypse in their music. They portray themselves as "living dead", describing their use of psychedelics such as LSD and psilocybin mushrooms as having caused them to experience ego death and rebirth.

== Metaphorical uses ==
=== Social activism ===
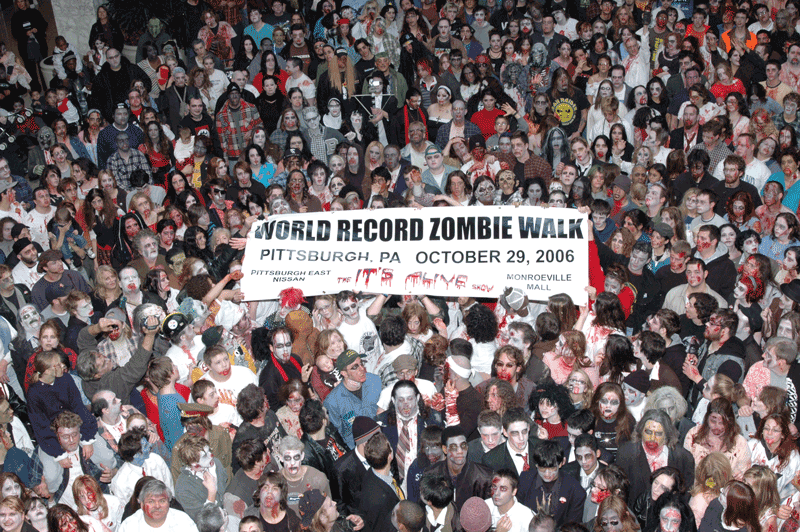
A zombie walk in Pittsburgh

The zombie also appears as a metaphor in protest songs, symbolizing mindless adherence to authority, particularly that of law enforcement and the armed forces. Well-known examples include Fela Kuti's 1976 song "Zombie" and the Cranberries' 1994 single "Zombie".

Organized zombie walks have been staged, either as performance art or as part of protests that parody political extremism or apathy.

A variation of the zombie walk is the zombie run. Here participants do a 5 km run wearing a belt with several flag "lives". If the chasing zombies capture all of the flags, the runner becomes "infected". If he or she reaches the finish line, which may involve wide detours ahead of the zombies, then the participant is a "survivor". In either case, an appropriate participation medal is awarded.

=== Artworks ===
Artist Jillian McDonald has made several works of video art involving zombies and exhibited them in her 2006 show "Horror Make-Up", which debuted on 8 September 2006 at Art Moving Projects, a gallery in, Williamsburg, Brooklyn.

Artist Karim Charredib has dedicated his work to the zombie figure. In 2007, he made a video installation at Villa Savoye called "Them !!!", wherein zombies walked in the villa like tourists.

=== Preparedness ===
On 18 May 2011, the United States' Centers for Disease Control and Prevention (CDC) published a graphic novel entitled Preparedness 101: Zombie Apocalypse, providing tips to survive a zombie invasion as a "fun new way of teaching the importance of emergency preparedness". The CDC used the metaphor of a zombie apocalypse to illustrate the value of laying in water, food, medical supplies, and other necessities in preparation for any and all potential disasters, be they hurricanes, earthquakes, tornadoes, floods, or hordes of zombies.

In 2011, the U.S. Department of Defense drafted CONPLAN 8888, a training exercise detailing a strategy to defend against a zombie attack.

=== Theoretical academic studies ===
Researchers have used theoretical zombie infections to test epidemiology modeling. One study found that all humans end up turned or dead. This is because the main epidemiological risk of zombies, besides the difficulties of neutralizing them, is that their population just keeps increasing; generations of humans merely "surviving" still have a tendency to feed zombie populations, resulting in gross outnumbering. The researchers explain that their methods of modelling may be applicable to the spread of political views or diseases with dormant infection.

Adam Chodorow of the Sandra Day O'Connor College of Law at Arizona State University investigated the estate and income tax implications of a zombie apocalypse under United States federal and state tax codes. Neuroscientists Bradley Voytek and Timothy Verstynen have built a side career in extrapolating how ideas in neuroscience would theoretically apply to zombie brains. Their work has been featured in Forbes, New York magazine, and other publications.

== See also ==
- List of zombie Nazi films
- List of zombie short films and undead-related projects
- Mankurt, zombie-like character coined by Kyrgyz author, Chinghiz Aitmatov
- Clairvius Narcisse
- Ophiocordyceps unilateralis, a fungus that creates so-called "zombie ants" or, more generally, behavior-altering parasites
- "Philosophical zombie", a person without a consciousness, used in philosophical thought experiments
- Skeleton (undead)
- Smombie, a combination of "smartphone" and "zombie"
- Zuvembie
