= White Zombie (film) =

1932 film by Victor Hugo Halperin

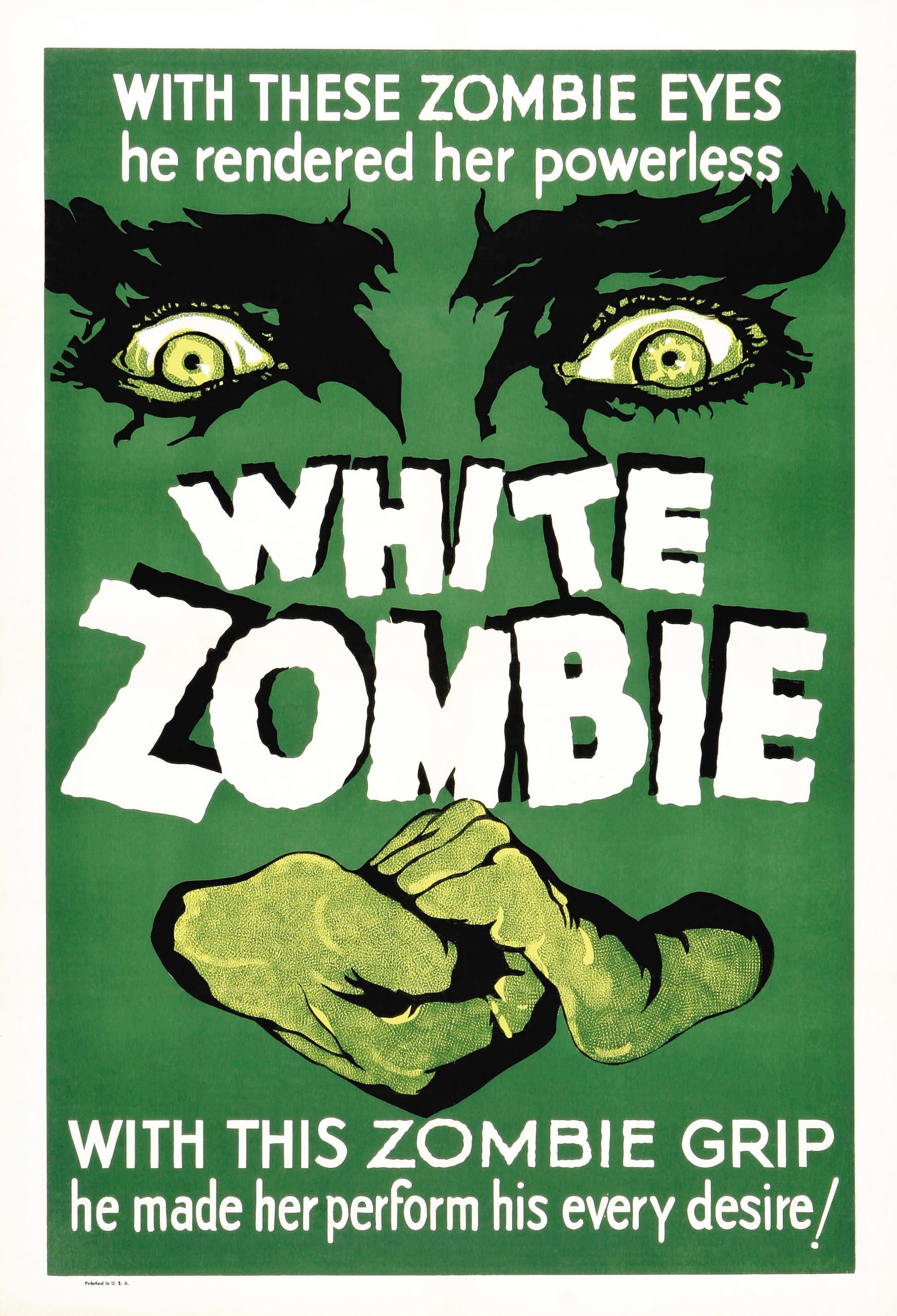
- Theatrical release poster
- Directed by: Victor Halperin
- Written by: Garnett Weston
- Based on: The Magic Island; 1929 novel by William Seabrook
- Produced by: Edward Halperin
- Starring: Bela Lugosi
- Cinematography: Arthur Martinelli
- Edited by: Harold McLernon
- Music by: Guy Bevier Williams; Hugo Riesenfeld; Xavier Cugat; Nathaniel Dett; Gaston Borch; Leo Kempenski; Hen Herkan; H. Maurice Jacquet
- Production company: Halperin Productions
- Distributed by: United Artists
- Release date: July 28, 1932
- Running time: 67 minutes; or 68 or 70 minutes
- Country: United States
- Language: English
- Budget: $50,000 (approx.)

White Zombie is a 1932 pre-Code horror movie produced independently by Edward Halperin and directed by Victor Halperin. The screenplay by Garnett Weston, based on The Magic Island, a non-fiction travel book by William Seabrook, is about a young woman's transformation into a zombie by a voodoo master. Bela Lugosi features as the zombie master Legendre, with Madge Bellamy appearing as one of his victims. Other cast members include Joseph Cawthorn, Robert W. Frazer, John Harron, Brandon Hurst, and George Burr MacAnnan.

Large portions of White Zombie were filmed on the Universal Studios lot, borrowing many props and scenery from other horror movies of the era. The movie premiered in New York to negative reception, with reviewers criticizing the movie's implausible story and weak acting. While the movie made a substantial financial profit as an independent feature, it proved less popular than other horror movies of the time.

White Zombie is considered the first feature length zombie movie; a loose sequel, Revolt of the Zombies, opened in 1936. Developing a cult following over the decades, modern reception to White Zombie has been more positive; with praise of the movie's atmosphere and comparisons to the 1940s horror movies of Val Lewton.

== Plot ==
The action of White Zombie is set in Haiti in 1932. Much of the plot concerns Legendre, Beaumont, another plantation master, and a newly arrived couple, Neil and his fiancée Madeleine, and how Legendre turns her into a "braindead" zombie.

On arrival in Haiti, Madeleine Short reunites with her fiancé Neil Parker, with imminent plans to be married. On the way to their lodging, the couple's coach passes "Murder" Legendre, an evil voodoo master, who observes them with interest, and grabs Madeleine's scarf, which he uses for later voodoo rituals against her. Neil and Madeleine arrive at the home of a wealthy plantation owner, Charles Beaumont, whom Madeleine met while travelling from New York. Charles' obsession with Madeleine prompts him to meet Legendre secretly in Legendre's sugarcane-mill, operated by zombies, one of whom falls into a cane-grinding pit. Charles wants to convince Madeleine to marry him and solicits Legendre's supernatural assistance. Legendre states that the only way to help Charles is to transform Madeleine into a zombie with a potion. Beaumont, aghast at first, finally agrees, takes the potion, and surreptitiously gives it to Madeleine inside flowers for her wedding.

Soon after Madeleine and Neil's wedding ceremony, local missionary Dr. Bruner presiding, the potion takes effect on Madeleine, who apparently dies and is entombed soon afterward. Murder and Charles enter Madeleine's tomb at night and bring her back to life as a zombie. In a drunken state, a depressed Neil sees ghostly apparitions of Madeleine and goes to her tomb. On finding it empty, Neil seeks out the assistance of Bruner, who informs him that Madeleine might not be dead at all; he recounts how Murder had used potions to turn many of his rivals into living but soulless zombies, who now act as Murder's closest guardians. The two men journey to Murder's cliffside castle to rescue Madeleine.

At the castle, Charles has begun to regret Madeleine's transformation and begs Legendre to return her to life, but Murder refuses. Charles discovers he has been tainted by Legendre's voodoo and is also transforming into a zombie. As Neil enters the fortress, Legendre senses his presence and silently orders Madeleine to kill Neil. She approaches Neil with a knife, but Bruner grabs her hand from behind a curtain, making her drop the knife and walk away. Neil follows Madeleine to an escarpment, where Legendre commands his zombie guardians to kill Neil, who shoots them, but this does not stop them.

Bruner approaches Legendre and knocks him out, breaking Legendre's mental control of his zombies. Undirected, the zombies walk forward and topple off the cliff. Legendre awakens and eludes Neil and Bruner, but Charles pushes Legendre off the cliff. Charles loses his balance and also falls to his death. Legendre's death releases Madeleine from her zombie trance, and she awakens to embrace Neil.

== Cast ==
White Zombie.

- Bela Lugosi as "Murder" Legendre, a white Haitian voodoo master who commands a crew of zombies.
- Madge Bellamy as Madeleine Short, Neil Parker's fiancée, who is turned into a zombie by Legendre.
- Joseph Cawthorn as Dr. Bruner: a missionary preacher.
- Robert W. Frazer as Charles Beaumont, a plantation owner obsessed with Madeleine.
- John Harron as Neil Parker, a bank employee, the fiancé of Madeleine.
- Brandon Hurst as Silver, Beaumont's butler.
- George Burr Macannan as Von Gelder, a formerly rich man who has fallen under Legendre's spell to become a zombie.
- Clarence Muse as a coach driver.
- Frederick Peters as Chauvin, a zombie, the former high executioner.
- Annette Stone as a maid.
- John Printz as Ledot, a zombie, a former witch doctor who was once Legendre's master
- Dan Crimmins as Pierre, an old witch doctor.
- Claude Morgan as Garcia, a zombie who used to be a thief.
- John Fergusson as Marquee, a zombie who was the chief of the police.
- Velma Gresham as the tall maid.

== Production ==
The zombie theme of White Zombie was inspired by – but the screenplay not based on – the Broadway play by Kenneth Webb titled Zombie. Webb sued the Halperins for copyright infringement, but did not win his case. Hoping to cash in on the country's interest in voodoo, which began with William B. Seabrook's 1929 book on Haitian voodou, The Magic Island, the movie, then titled Zombie, went into development in early 1932. The Halperins leased office space from Universal Studios. Garnett Weston's story focuses more on action than dialogue. To aid the Halperins, producer Phil Goldstone helped secure funds for White Zombie as he had for other independent movies at the time. Much of the funding came from Amusement Securities Corp.

White Zombie was filmed in eleven days in March 1932 and was filmed at the Universal Studios lot, at RKO-Pathé, and in Bronson Canyon on such a small budget – approximately $50,000 – that it had to be filmed at night. Other than Béla Lugosi and Joseph Cawthorn, the majority of the cast in White Zombie were actors whose fame had diminished since the silent film era.

By the time Bela Lugosi appeared in White Zombie, he was already popular with contemporary audiences after his major role in the successful 1931 movie Dracula and 1932's Murders in the Rue Morgue, and movie historians have found it surprising that he would sign on to a low-budget movie by producers (the Halperin brothers) with no reputation in Hollywood. Sources vary about Lugosi's salary for his week of work on White Zombie. Claims range between US$500 to $900. Richard Sheffield, who was his close friend during the 1950s, reported a payment of $5,000 for White Zombie on Lugosi's tax returns.

The cast and crew's reaction to Lugosi on the set was mixed. Madge Bellamy recalled her collaboration with Lugosi positively, stating that he was very pleasant and that he used to kiss her hand in the morning when they would come on to the set. In contrast, assistant cameraman Enzo Martinelli remarked that "Lugosi wasn't really a friendly type" on set. Actor Clarence Muse, who played the coach driver, claimed that some scenes were partly re-written or re-staged by Lugosi, who also helped to direct some re-takes.

Lugosi's model for his portrayal of "Murder" Legendre in White Zombie may have been the character he played in 1919's Slaves of a Foreign Will (Sklaven fremden Willens), his first German movie, in which he played a Svengali-like hypnotist with mesmerizing eyes.

Phil Goldstone had previously worked with Bellamy and offered her the role of Madeleine Short for a salary of $5,000. For the role of Dr. Bruner, the Halperins looked for an actor with name value and decided to cast Joseph Cawthorn, who was then known to audiences only as comic relief in stage and movie roles. Set designer Ralph Berger utilized the rented sets of previous movies. These sets included the great halls from Dracula, pillars and a hanging balcony from The Hunchback of Notre Dame (1923), the dark corridors from Frankenstein (1931) and chairs from The Cat and the Canary (1927). At RKO-Pathé sets from The King of Kings (1927) were used for the interior of Legendre's castle.

In addition to Berger, assistant director William Cody and sound director L.E. "Pete" Clark earned their first movie credit by working on White Zombie. Jack Pierce, Lugosi's make-up artist on White Zombie, had been responsible for the make-up of several other famous horror movies of the era including Frankenstein, The Wolf Man, and The Mummy (1932).

Clarence Muse took over the role of the coach driver after principal photography had already begun. Some footage of the unknown original was used in White Zombie.

The music of White Zombie was supervised by Abe Meyer. Instead of using pre-recorded music, Meyer had orchestras record new versions of compositions for each specific movie he was involved in. The music in White Zombie draws from works including Mussorgsky's "Pictures at an Exhibition", Gaston Borch's "Incidental Symphonies", and Hugo Riesenfeld's "Death of the Great Chief". Other pieces on the White Zombie soundtrack include music written by Richard Wagner, H. Maurice Jacquet, Leo Kempenski, and Franz Liszt. The movie begins with "Chant", a composition of wordless vocals and drumming, created by Universal Studios employee Guy Bevier Williams, a specialist in ethnic music.

Footage filmed for White Zombie was recycled for a follow-up movie, Revolt of the Zombies – also made by Halperin Productions – which was released in 1936.

== "Murder" Legendre ==
"Murder" Legendre
- White Zombie character
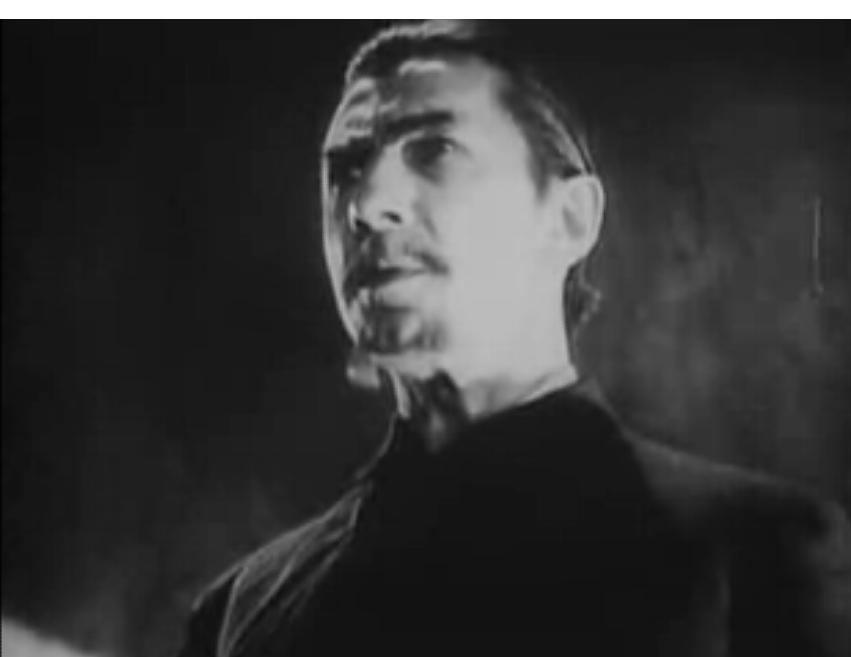
- Lugosi as Murder Legendre
- First appearance: White Zombie
- Created by: Victor Halperin
- Portrayed by: Bela Lugosi

In-universe information
- Gender: male
- Occupation: voodoo doctor sugar-mill owner
- Spouse: none
- Relatives: none
- Nationality: Haitian
- Status: Deceased

Murder Legendre (also stylised "Murder" Legendre) is the antagonist of the film, portrayed by actor Bela Lugosi. A malevolent voodoo and zombie master with telepathic powers, this character is remembered as one of the actor's most striking performances and has been the subject of various interpretations.

Murder Legendre was born in Haiti somewhere in the 1890s–1900s. At a young age, he met Ledot, a witch doctor who taught him all the skills of voodoo and witchcraft. After mastering them all, Murder becomes a vodou master himself. He used his voodoo powers to turn Ledot into a zombie, he then turned many of his enemies into zombies and made them all work as slaves in his sugar-mill.

The character of Legendre is in general identified as white. But some authors identify him as black. In her essay on White Zombie and the Creole, Gillian Phillips insists that Legendre's ethnicity is ambiguous and that he embodies both sides of Haitian history. Although his name suggests French roots, Legendre is also presented as a foreign personality of indeterminate origin, who resents the way all sides of the society of the island have treated him.

He is presented as a necromancer, a sorcerer, a voodoo master or a zombie master.

One of his most defining features is his "sardonically evil smirk", his hypnotic gaze and "long" hands, as well as a forked beard, the result of make-up work by Jack Pierce.

=== Inspiration ===
According to author and adventurer William Seabrook in his 1929 novel The Magic Island, a voodoo priestess he met, Maman Celie, briefly inspired Legendre who also is a voodoo priest and witch doctor. In the first chapter of the book, Seabrook describes an innocent Haitian girl being sacrificed and in another, a group of zombies working at a sugar-mill.

=== Analysis ===
Film historian Gary Don Rhodes mentions in his book about White Zombie that Legendre's Haitian nationality, occupation as a voodoo doctor, and appearance link him closely to Satanism, especially Mephistopheles or Satan himself, while Dr. Bruner would represent Christ. Rhodes also mentions that when Beaumont allows Legendre to drug Madeleine, he literally sells his soul to the devil, especially when Legendre drugs him later on to turn him into a zombie as well. Legendre's sugar-mill and castle are built and worked on by his mind-controlled zombies, showcasing the slavery also used to build Mephistopheles's castle, even it is said by Rhodes that Legendre himself prays to the devil with his zombie voodoo rituals.

Robert Duffey, in his book about Lugosi, calls the character "one of the great Mephistophelean figures in cinema".

=== Bela Lugosi's performance ===
Bela Lugosi is said to have been "severely underpaid" for the performance. The character's malevolence was compared to the actor's own impersonation of Dracula and various commentators consider this performance to be his most notable one after the latter.

In his book about horror film, however, Bryan Seen, who describes him in another book as the "epitome of evil", finds that the character is too unidimensional to allow Lugosi to fully show his talent.

== Release ==
White Zombie experienced distribution problems from the beginning, and went through several film studios including Columbia Studios and Educational Pictures before its initial release. United Artists had been distributing several independent and foreign films that year and bought the rights to release White Zombie. A preview of White Zombie's first cut was shown on June 16, 1932, in New York City. This print of White Zombie had a running time of 74 minutes, whereas the regular distribution prints ran for only 69 minutes.

=== Critical response ===
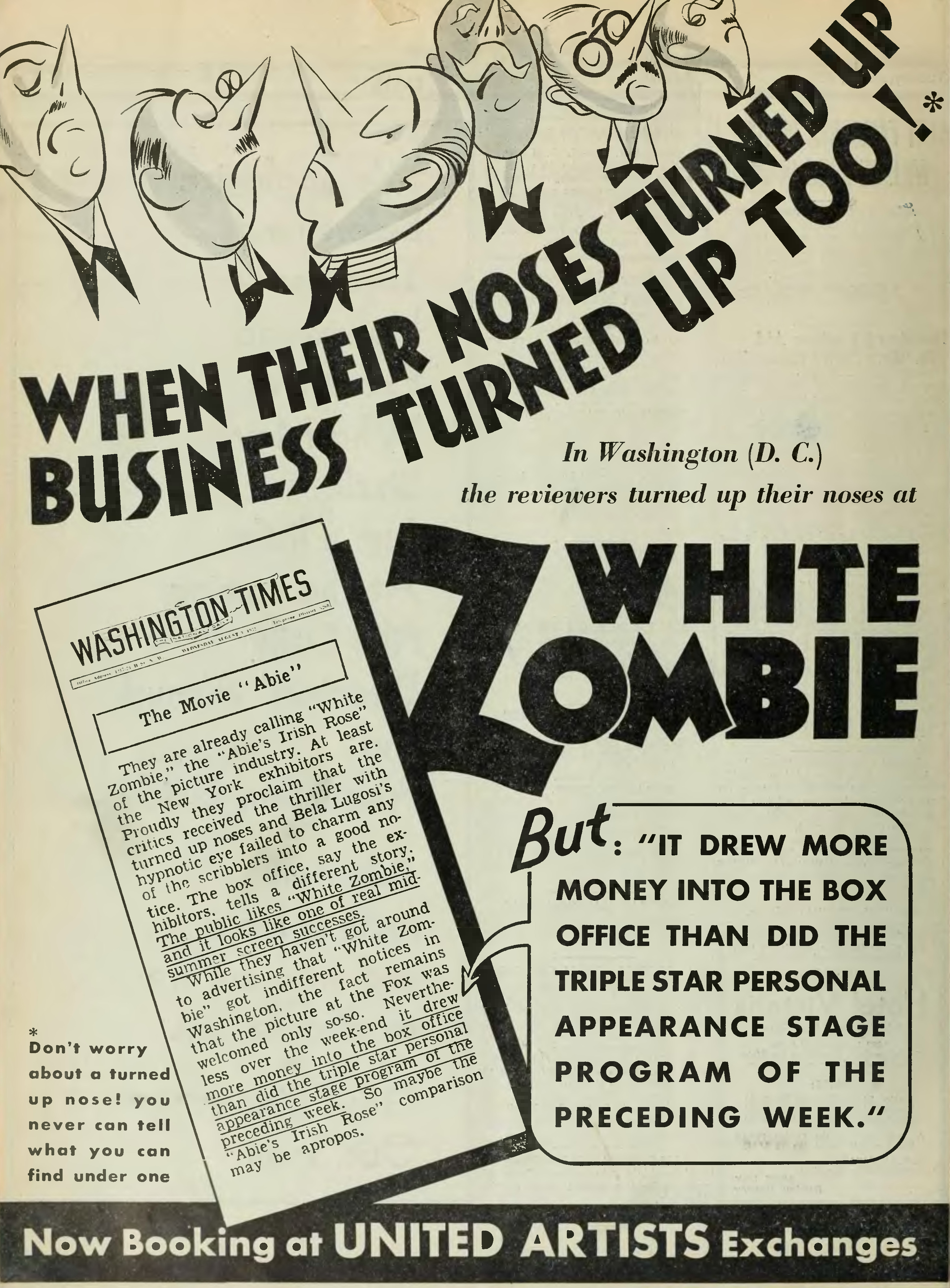
White Zombie ad from The Film Daily, 1932 mentions the critics' negative reviews, but great box office ticket sales.

Most critical reviews focused on the poor silent era-style acting, stilted dialogue, and over-the-top storyline. William Boehnel of the New York World-Telegram stated: "The plot...is really ridiculous, but not so startlingly so as the acting." Thornton Delehaney of the New York Evening Post wrote, "[T]he story tries to out-Frankenstein Frankenstein, and so earnest is it in its attempt to be thrilling that it overreaches its mark all along the line and resolves into an unintentional and often hilarious comedy." Irene Thirer of the New York Daily News wrote, "Many fantastic and eerie scenes are evolved, but most of them border on ludicrous". Industry trade reviews were more positive. The Film Daily wrote: "It rates with the best of this type of film [...] Bela Lugosi is very impressive and makes the picture worthwhile". Harrison's Reports wrote, "[The film] is certainly not up to the standards of Dracula or Frankenstein, but the types of audience that go for horror pictures will enjoy it".

National media outlet reviewers were generally negative. Commonweal opined, "[The film is] interesting only in measure of its complete failure". Liberty wrote, "If you do not get a shock out of this thriller, you will get one out of the acting". In Vanity Fair's "Worst Movie of 1932" article, Pare Lorentz wrote about a "terrific deadlock with Blonde Venus holding a slight lead over White Zombie, Bring 'Em Back Alive, and Murders in the Rue Morgue". In the United Kingdom, press was mixed. The Kinematograph Weekly thought the film was "quite well acted, and has good atmosphere" but thought, too, it was "not for the squeamish or the highly intelligent". The Cinema News and Property Gazette thought the film was for the "less sophisticated" and that the "exaggerated treatment of the subject achieves reverse effect to thrill or conviction". Years after the film's release, Victor Halperin expressed a distaste for his horror films: "I don't believe in fear, violence, and horror, so why traffic in them?"

Modern critical reception has been mostly positive, with critics praising the film's atmosphere while deprecating the acting; with review aggregate site Rotten Tomatoes giving the film a 80% rating based on 25 reviews Time Out London wrote, "Halperin shoots this poetic melodrama as trance... The unique result constitutes a virtual bridge between classic Universal horror and the later Val Lewton productions." TV Guide gave the film three-and-a-half stars out of four, comparing the film's atmosphere to Carl Dreyer's film Vampyr. However, the magazine described the acting as "woefully inadequate", with the exception of Lugosi. Edward G. Bansk, a Val Lewton biographer, identified several flaws in White Zombie, including poor acting, bad timing and other "haphazard and sloppy" film aspects. Bansk wrote, "Although White Zombie is a film with courage, a film difficult not to admire, its ambitions overstep competence of its principal players." Noting Legendre's statement that obedient zombies "work faithfully and are not worried with long hours," the film has also been seen as an allegory of class exploitation under capitalism and colonialism.

=== Box office ===
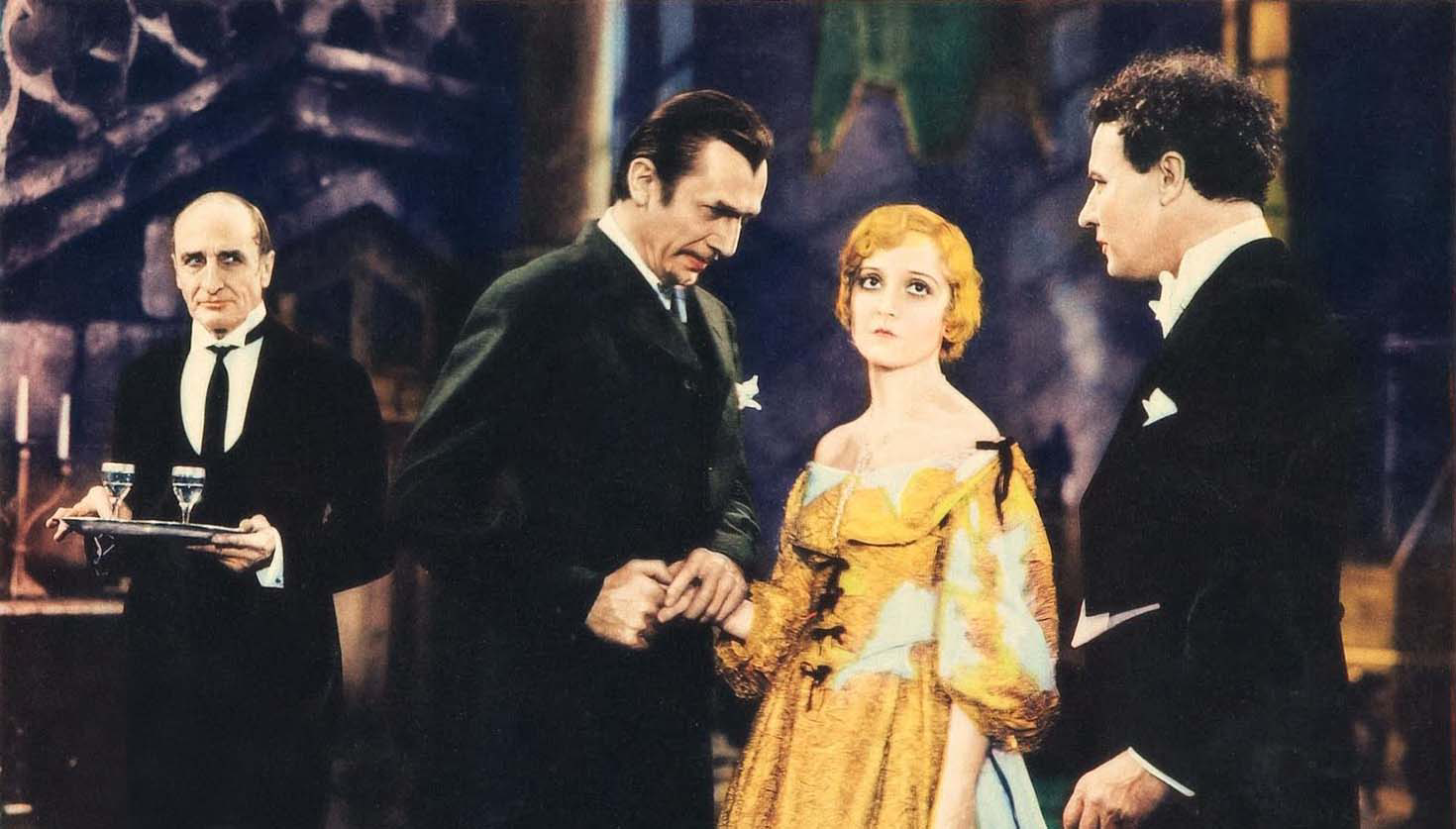
Colored publicity shot for White Zombie, featuring Brandon Hurst, Bela Lugosi, Madge Bellamy, and John Harron.

White Zombie premiered on July 28, 1932, in New York City's Rivoli Theatre. The film received a mixed box office reception upon its initial release, but was a great financial success for an independent film at the time. In 1933 and 1934, the film experienced positive box-office numbers in small towns in the United States, as well as in Germany under the title Flucht von der Teufelsinsel. White Zombie was one of the few American horror films to be approved by the Nazis. The popularity of the film led Victor Halperin to a contract with Paramount Studios.

Opening on July 29, 1932, in Providence, Rhode Island, and Indianapolis, Indiana, the film grossed $9,900 and $5,000, respectively, following one-week engagements. Frankenstein and other contemporary horror films had grossed more in Providence, and the Indianapolis theater "wasn't too happy with White Zombie, but what audiences saw it were pleased enough." In Cleveland, Ohio, White Zombie sold a record 16,728 tickets its first weekend on its initial release in August. In Montreal, Quebec, Canada, the film opened August 3 at the Princess Theatre. The facade had been transformed into a "House of the Living Dead" and "zombies" walked atop the marquee. The film failed to gross its estimated $8,000 and earned only $6,500 following a one-week run at the Princess Theatre. In comparison, Dracula had grossed $14,000 at Montreal's Palace Theatre during its first week in March 1931.

=== Home media ===
White Zombie was transferred from poor quality prints to VHS and Betamax in the 1980s. The film has been released on DVD from several companies–including K-Tel and Alpha Video—with varying image quality. The book Zombie Movies: The Ultimate Guide described the Roan's later DVD release of the title as the best available. The online film database Allmovie features a positive review of the Roan Group's transfer, stating the film "has never looked better". The film was released on Blu-ray on January 29, 2013, from Kino Video.

== Aftermath and influence ==
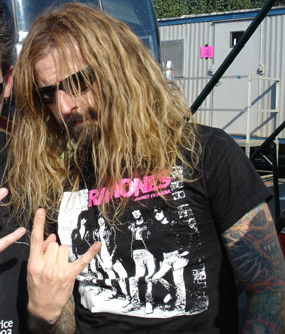
Musician Rob Zombie used the name of the movie for his group White Zombie.

White Zombie is considered to be the first feature length zombie film and has been described as the archetype and model of all zombie movies. Not many early horror films followed White Zombie's Haitian origins style. Other horror films from the 1930s borrowed themes from White Zombie, such as people returning from the dead and other elements of zombie mythology. These films include: The Ghost Breakers (1940), King of the Zombies (1941), I Walked with a Zombie (1943), and The Plague of the Zombies (1966). These films all contain elements from White Zombie including the blank-eyed stares, the voodoo drums, and zombies performing manual labor.

Victor Halperin directed a White Zombie loose sequel, Revolt of the Zombies, which was released in 1936. Béla Lugosi was considered for the role of villain Armand Louque, but the part went to Dean Jagger when the producers had a dispute with Lugosi. Cinematographer Arthur Martinelli and producer Edward Halperin returned. In the film, Lugosi's hypnotic eyes from White Zombie could be seen in the opening montage. Modern critical response to Revolt of the Zombies is generally unfavorable. In a review from Zombie Movies: The Ultimate Guide, the review declares that "[T]here's no experimentation here, only dull composition shots and flatly lit shots of yakking characters in a by-the-numbers plot." AllMovie rated White Zombie three stars out of five, while it gave Revolt of the Zombies only one star and deemed it far inferior to the original.

Scenes from White Zombie have appeared in other films including Curtis Hanson's The Hand That Rocks the Cradle, Michael Almereyda's Nadja, and Tim Burton's Ed Wood.

Legendre reappeared later in various stories associated with Prowler.

The heavy metal band White Zombie took their name from the film. The group's vocalist Rob Zombie said of the film, "[It's] a great film that not a lot of people know about...It amazes me that a film that is so readily available can be so lost." In 1997, the Janus company released a model kit based on the Murder Legendre character.

In 2009, it was announced that Tobe Hooper would direct a remake of White Zombie. Jared Rivet wrote the screenplay for Hooper's remake but the project never came to fruition.

The character, who, according to Mark Clark in his books about acting in horror cinema, remains "endlessly fascinating", is also central to a 2017 novel prequel to the film: Memoirs of Murder: A Prequel to the 1932 Classic, White Zombie by Brad A. Braddock, that contains a fictional "personal diary of Murder Legendre himself".

There was also originally going to be a remake of White Zombie in 2018 by Blumhouse Productions under the leadership of Jason Blum but it is unknown whether those plans are coming in the future or not.

Star Ace toys made a 1:6 scale toy model and figure of Murder Legendre based on Bela Lugosi's likeness, which comes equipped with his raven. Other figures representing Legendre have been issued.

In 2023, Rob Zombie and Waxwork Records collaborated to release the original soundtrack of White Zombie on vinyl record, as the first release in a "Rob Zombie Presents" line of horror film soundtracks. It was pressed on coloured vinyl and housed in special packaging featuring artwork by Graham Humphreys.

== See also ==
- Bela Lugosi filmography
- List of American films of 1932
- List of cult films
- List of horror films of the 1930s
- Pre-Code
- Haitian Vodou
- History of Haitian nationality and citizenship
