= A Thousand Deaths (London short story) =

- Short story by Jack London
- Country: United States
- Language: English
- Genre: Short story

Publication
- Publication date: 1899

"A Thousand Deaths" is an 1899 short story by Jack London, his first work to be published. It is about the experimentally induced death and resuscitation/resurrection of the protagonist, by a mad scientist who uses multiple scientific methods for these experiments. It was published in Black Cat magazine. In John Barleycorn London explains that he was paid 40 dollars for the story. The story was adapted to film in 1939.

== Film adaptation ==
In 1939, a Hollywood B movie titled Torture Ship was loosely based on "A Thousand Deaths".

In 2014, writer-director Adam Zanzie released a short film adaptation which premiered at the St. Louis Filmmakers Showcase, where it won awards for Best Actor (John Bratkowski) and Best Sound Design. It later screened at the Trash Film Festival in Varaždin, Croatia, in 2016.

== See also ==
- Flatliners
