= Torture Ship =

1939 film by Victor Hugo Halperin

- Theatrical poster
- Directed by: Victor Halperin
- Screenplay by: George Sayre; Harvey Huntley
- Based on: "A Thousand Deaths" by Jack London
- Produced by: Ben Judell; Sigmund Neufeld
- Starring: Lyle Talbot; Irving Pichel; Julie Bishop; Sheila Bromley
- Cinematography: Jack Greenhalgh
- Edited by: Holbrook Todd
- Production company: Producers Distributing Corporation
- Distributed by: Producers Distributing Corporation
- Release date: October 22, 1939
- Running time: 64 minutes
- Country: United States
- Language: English

Torture Ship is a 1939 American science fiction horror film directed by Victor Halperin, based on Jack London's 1899 short story "A Thousand Deaths". The film stars Lyle Talbot as a mad scientist who performs experiments regarding "the criminal mind" on captured criminals onboard his private ship.

== Cast ==
- Lyle Talbot as Lt. Bob Bennett
- Irving Pichel as Dr. Herbert Stander
- Julie Bishop as Joan Martel
- Sheila Bromley as Poison Mary Slavish
- Anthony Averill as Dirk - Stander's Aide
- Russell Hopton as Harry "The Carver" Bogard
- Julian Madison as Paul - Stander's Aide
- Eddie Holden as Ole Olson
- Wheeler Oakman as John Ritter
- Stanley Blystone as Captain Mike Briggs
- Leander De Cordova as Ezra Matthews
- Demetrius Alexis as Steve Murano
- Skelton Knaggs as Jesse Bixel

== Production ==
The film is based on the short story "A Thousand Deaths" by Jack London originally published in Black Cat Magazine in May 1899.

By the end of the first week of August 1939, George Sayre and Harvey Huntley completed the script for Torture Ship and the film was scheduled to start on August 14 but was held back. Filming was then set to begin by the last week of August but no cast was yet assembled. The cast was announced in September with John Miller originally set to play Jesse, though Skelton Knaggs appears in the final film.

== Release ==
Torture Ship was distributed by Producers Distributing Corporation on October 22, 1939.

== Reception ==
From contemporary reviews, "Herb." of Variety noted the acting in the film stating "there can be no quarrel with the acting of the principals" but that Torture Ship was a "quickie action thriller that misses fire [sic] all the way on its possibilities" and that the film "has so many unreasonable and unexplainable points that it will annoy even the most jueve-minded [sic]" The Film Daily also praised the film's acting while finding Halperin's direction as "O.K." while declaring the film "has enough punch and drama to satisfy the nabe trade."
