= Victor Halperin =

American film director (1895–1983)

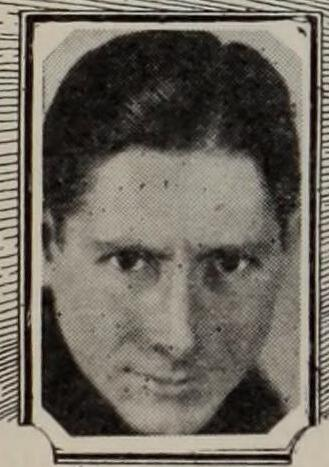
- Halperin c. 1929
- Born: August 24, 1895; Chicago, Illinois, U.S.
- Died: May 17, 1983 (aged 87); Bentonville, Arkansas, U.S.
- Occupations: Stage actor, stage director, film director, producer, writer
- Notable work: White Zombie (1932)

Victor Hugo Halperin (August 24, 1895 – May 17, 1983) was an American stage actor, stage director, film director, producer, and writer. The majority of his works involved romance and horror. His brother, with whom he collaborated, was producer Edward Halperin (May 12, 1898 – March 2, 1981).

== Biography ==
Victor Halperin began his career as a filmmaker in 1922, working as a writer on The Danger Point (an original story). In two years, he was working as a writer-producer-director on the Agnes Ayres film, When a Girl Loves. He is best known for his 1932 horror film White Zombie, starring Madge Bellamy and Bela Lugosi. Once thought "lost", the film has grown in stature over the years, first gaining a cult status, and eventually becoming recognized as one of the leading classics of the genre. Years after the film's release, Victor Halperin expressed a distaste for his horror films: "I don't believe in fear, violence, and horror, so why traffic in them?"

Other notable horror films Halperin directed include Supernatural (1933) and Revolt of the Zombies (1936).

Halperin often worked in collaboration with his brother Edward. The Halperin brothers produced a series of independent low-budget films in the 1930s. Victor Halperin retired in 1942, after working as a director at PRC studios.

== Filmography ==
Director

- Greater Than Marriage (1924)
- When a Girl Loves (1924) (also producer)
- The Unknown Lover (1925) (also producer)
- School for Wives (1925) (also producer)
- In Borrowed Plumes (1926) (also producer)
- Dance Magic (1927)
- Ex-Flame (1930)
- Party Girl (1930) (also producer)
- White Zombie (1932)
- Supernatural (1933) (also producer)
- I Conquer the Sea! (1936) (also producer)
- Revolt of the Zombies (1936)
- Racing Blood (1936)
- Nation Aflame (1937) (also producer)
- Buried Alive (1939)
- Torture Ship (1939)
- Girls' Town (1942)

Producer

- The Danger Point (1922)
- Double Reward (1922) (short film)
- Convoy (1927)
- She Goes to War (1929)
