= Silver Lake =

Silver Lake may refer to:

== Cities and towns ==
=== Canada ===
- Silver Lake, in Peterborough County, Ontario, a dispersed rural community in the municipality of Trent Lakes
- Silver Lake, in Renfrew County, Ontario, a dispersed rural community in the municipality of Bonnechere Valley

=== United States ===
- Silver Lake, Los Angeles, a neighborhood in Los Angeles, California
- Silver Lake, San Bernardino County, California, a ghost town
- Helendale, California, also known as Silver Lakes
- Silver Lake, Florida
- Silver Lake, Indiana
- Silver Lake, Kansas
- Erlanger, Kentucky, previously known as Silver Lake
- Silver Lake, Massachusetts, an unincorporated community
- Nonantum, Massachusetts, also known as Silver Lake
- Silver Lake, Minnesota
- Silver Lake, Missouri
- Silver Lake, New Hampshire, village in the town of Madison
- Silver Lake, Cumberland County, New Jersey
- Silver Lake, Essex County, New Jersey
- Silver Lake, Warren County, New Jersey
- Silver Lake, Otsego County, New York
- Silver Lake, Staten Island, New York
- Silver Lake Institute, New York, a community sometimes known simply as Silver Lake
- Silver Lake, Ohio
- Silver Lake, Oregon
- Silver Lake, Providence, Rhode Island
- Silverlake, Texas
- Silver Lake, Washington
- Silver Lake, Wisconsin, a town
- Silver Lake, Waushara County, Wisconsin, an unincorporated community

== Lakes ==
- Lago Argentino, literally Silver Lake, near El Calafate, Patagonia
- Silver Lake (Kawartha Lakes), Central Ontario, Canada
- Silver Lake (Lanark–Frontenac), Eastern Ontario, Canada
- Silver Lake (Serbia)

=== United States ===
- Silver Lake (Amador County), California, a reservoir
- Silver Lake (Mojave), California, a dry lake bed
- Silver Lake Reservoir, Los Angeles County, California
- Silver Lake (Dover, Delaware)
- Silver Lake (Milford, Delaware)
- Silver Lake (Rehoboth Beach, Delaware)
- Silver Lake (Highlands County, Florida)
- Silver Lake (Silver Lake, Florida)
- Silver Lake (Sumter County, Florida), a lake that is partly in Sumter County and partly in Hernando County
- Silver Lake (Blaine County, Idaho)
- Silver Lake (Kansas)
- Silver Lake (Pittsfield, Massachusetts)
- Silver Lake (Plymouth County, Massachusetts)
- Silver Lake (Wilmington, Massachusetts)
- Silver Lake (Michigan), list of lakes named or previously named Silver Lake in Michigan
- Silver Lake (Grand Traverse County, Michigan)
- Silver Lake (Waterford Township, Michigan)
- Silver Lake (Clay County, Minnesota)
- Silver Lake (Cook County, Minnesota)
- Silver Lake (Rochester, Minnesota)
- Silver Lake (St. Anthony, Minnesota)
- Silver Lake (Stone County, Missouri)
- Silver Lake (Harrisville, New Hampshire)
- Silver Lake (Hollis, New Hampshire)
- Silver Lake (Madison, New Hampshire)
- Silver Lake (Bovina, New York)
- Silver Lake (Clinton County, New York)
- Silver Lake (Delaware County, New York)
- Silver Lake (Woodridge, New York)
- Silver Lake (Wyoming County, New York)
- Silver Lake (Oregon)
- Silver Lake (Washington County, Rhode Island)
- Silver Lake (Hutchinson County, South Dakota)
- Silver Lake (Kingsbury County, South Dakota)
- Silver Lake (Miner County, South Dakota)
- Silver Lake (North Cascades National Park), Washington
- Silver Lake (Whatcom County, Washington)
- Silver Lake (Oconomowoc, Wisconsin)

== Parks ==
- Silver Lake Provincial Park, British Columbia, Canada
- Silver Lake Provincial Park (Ontario), Canada
- Silver Lake National Wildlife Refuge, North Dakota, United States
- Silver Lake State Park (Michigan), United States
- Silver Lake State Park (New Hampshire), United States
- Silver Lake State Park (New York), United States
- Silver Lake State Park (Vermont), United States
- Silver Lake Wilderness Area, Adirondack Mountains, New York, United States

== Education ==
- Silver Lake College, the name of Holy Family College 1972-2019 in Manitowoc, Wisconsin, United States
- Silver Lake Joint School District 1, Wisconsin, United States
- Silver Lake Regional High School, Kingston, Massachusetts, United States
- Silver Lake USD 372, a school district in the Topeka, Kansas, area

== Other uses ==
- Silver Lake (investment firm), a private equity firm based in Menlo Park, California
- Silver Lake Air Warning Station, Everett, Washington, United States
- Silver Lake Bank, Montrose, Pennsylvania, United States
- Silver Lake Dam, a dam in New York
- Silver Lake Dam (Michigan), a former dam near Marquette, Michigan, United States
- Silver Lake District, a historic district in Harrisville, New Hampshire, United States
- Silver Lake Farm, a historic site in Harrisville, New Hampshire, United States
- Silver Lake Film Festival, a former film festival in Los Angeles
- Silver Lake Forest Service Strip, an airfield in Lake County, Oregon, United States
- Silver Lake Mall, Coeur d'Alene, Idaho, United States
- Silver Lake Railroad, Madison, New Hampshire, United States
- Silver Lake station, a subway station in Belleville, New Jersey
- Silver Lake Village, a shopping center in St. Anthony, Minnesota, United States
- Der Silbersee or The Silver Lake, a play with music by Kurt Weill
- "Silver Lake", a 2011 song by Miss Kittin
- Silverlake, the codename for the IBM AS/400 during the development of that system

== See also ==
- Silbersee (disambiguation), German for Silver Lake
- Silver Lake Township (disambiguation)
- Under the Silver Lake, a 2018 film
