= Riverview Elementary School =

Riverview Elementary School may refer to:

In Canada:

- Riverview Elementary School, Quesnel

In the United States (by state):

- Riverview Elementary School (Corona, California), Corona-Norco Unified School District
- Riverview Elementary School (Riverview, Florida)
- Riverview Elementary School (Baltimore, Maryland)
- Riverview Elementary School (Denville, New Jersey)
- Riverview Elementary School (Vancouver, Washington)
- Riverview Elementary School, Silver Lake, Wisconsin
- Riverview Elementary School (Tonawanda, New York)
