= Silver Lake Farm =

- U.S. National Register of Historic Places
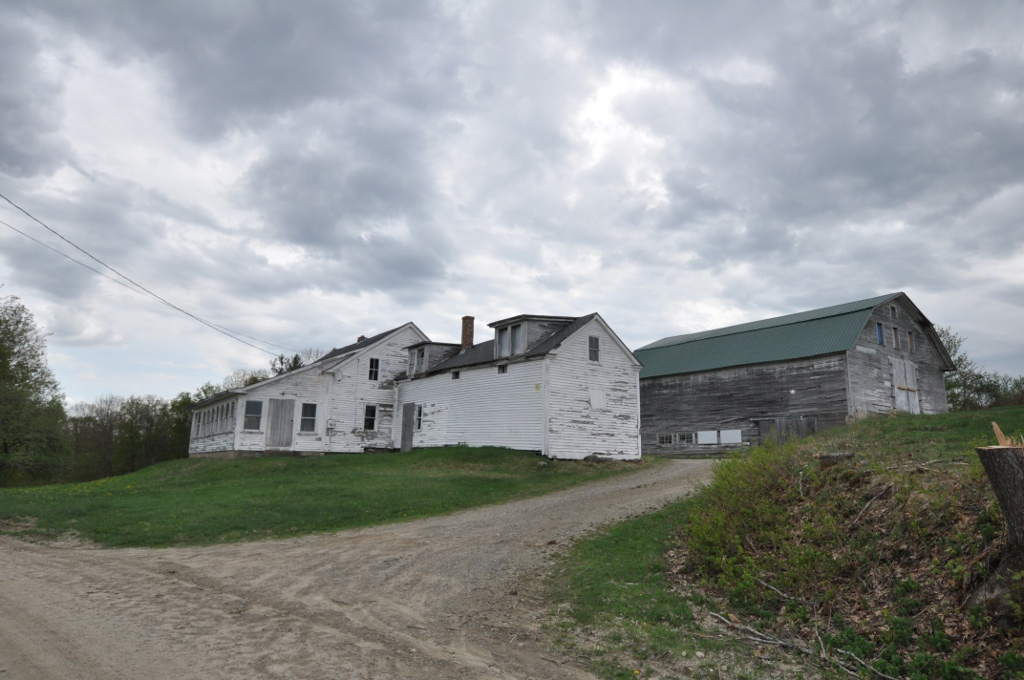

- Location within New Hampshire Location within the United States
- Location: Between Silver Lake and Seaver Rds. near intersection with Old Nelson Rd., Harrisville, New Hampshire
- Coordinates: 42°56′30″N 72°8′35″W
- Area: less than one acre
- Built: 1820
- MPS: Harrisville MRA
- NRHP reference No.: 86003252
- Added to NRHP: January 14, 1988

The Silver Lake Farm is a historic farmstead on Seaver Road in northwestern Harrisville, New Hampshire. Established about 1820, it was a highly successful local farm, serving first businesses as far off as Keene, and then the local summer resort trade at nearby Silver Lake. The house is relatively little-altered despite intensive use into the 20th century. The farmstead was listed on the National Register of Historic Places in 1988.

== Description and history ==
The Silver Lake Farm is located in a rural setting west of Harrisville village, on the west side of Seaver Road south of Breed Road. It is set high on a hillside, with fine views of the surrounding countryside, including the eponymous Silver Lake. It consists of a traditional New England farm complex, with a clapboarded farmhouse that was built c. 1820, a poultry shed, two early 20th-century barns, and a modern tractor shed.

The farm was originally established by Paul Whitcomb Breed, whose family gave the lake its early name (Breed Pond). It was later owned by the Farwells and Seavers, like the Breeds prominent Harrisville families. Despite its active use until the 1970s, the farmhouse remained relatively unaltered, lacking even modern heating. In addition to operating the farm, the Seavers also had a sawmill near the outlet of Silver Lake. Their customers included businesses and residents of nearby communities, as well as the summer residents who came to populate the Silver Lake area around the turn of the 20th century.

== See also ==
- Silver Lake District
- National Register of Historic Places listings in Cheshire County, New Hampshire
