= Silver Township =

Silver Township may refer to the following townships in the United States:

- Silver Township, Cherokee County, Iowa
- Silver Township, Carlton County, Minnesota

== See also ==
- Silver Creek Township (disambiguation)
- Silver Lake Township (disambiguation)
