= Tourism in the Arab world =

Map of the Arab countries (in green)

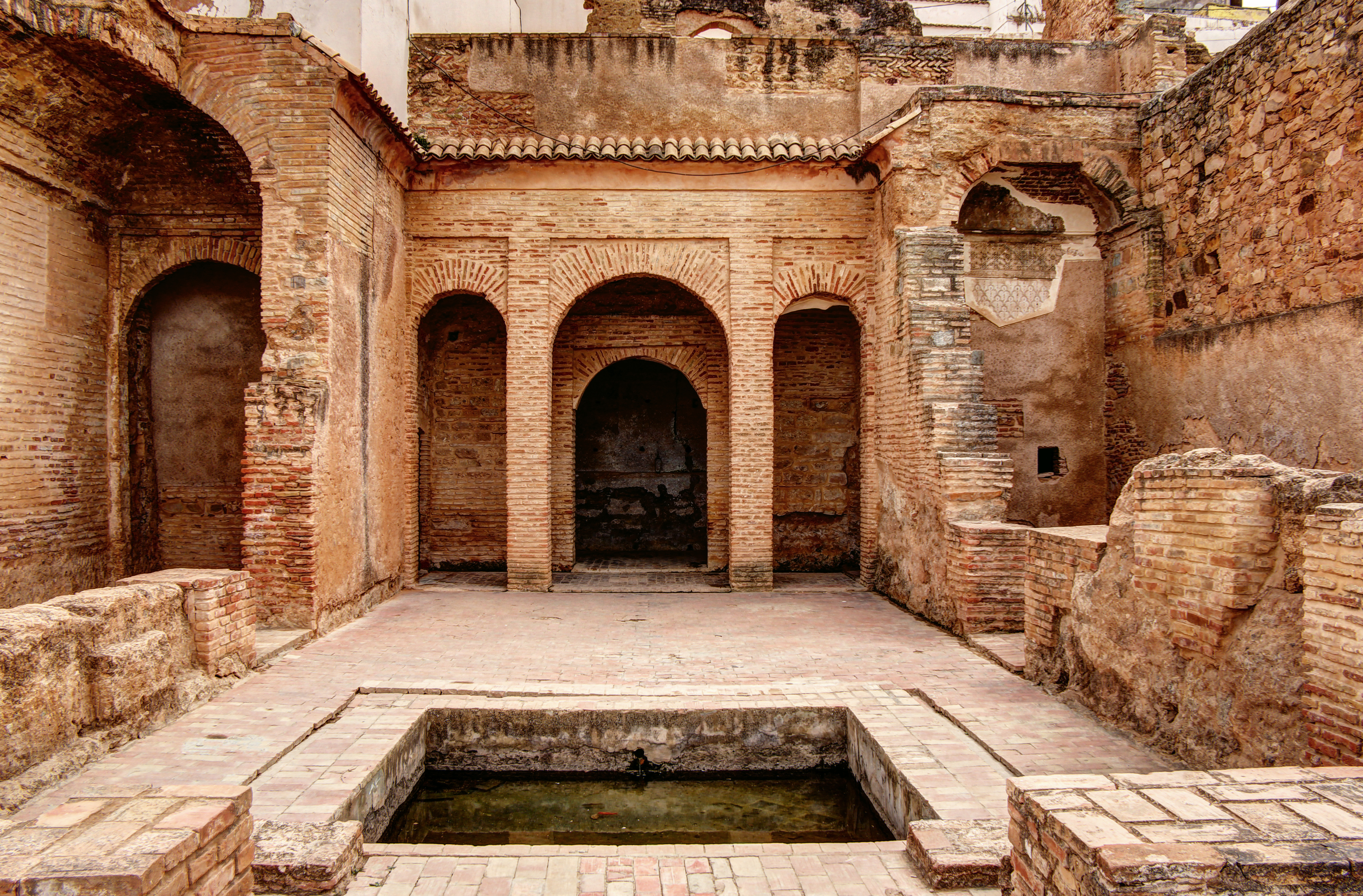
House next to the tomb of Sultan Sidi Boumediene in Tlemcen, Algeria

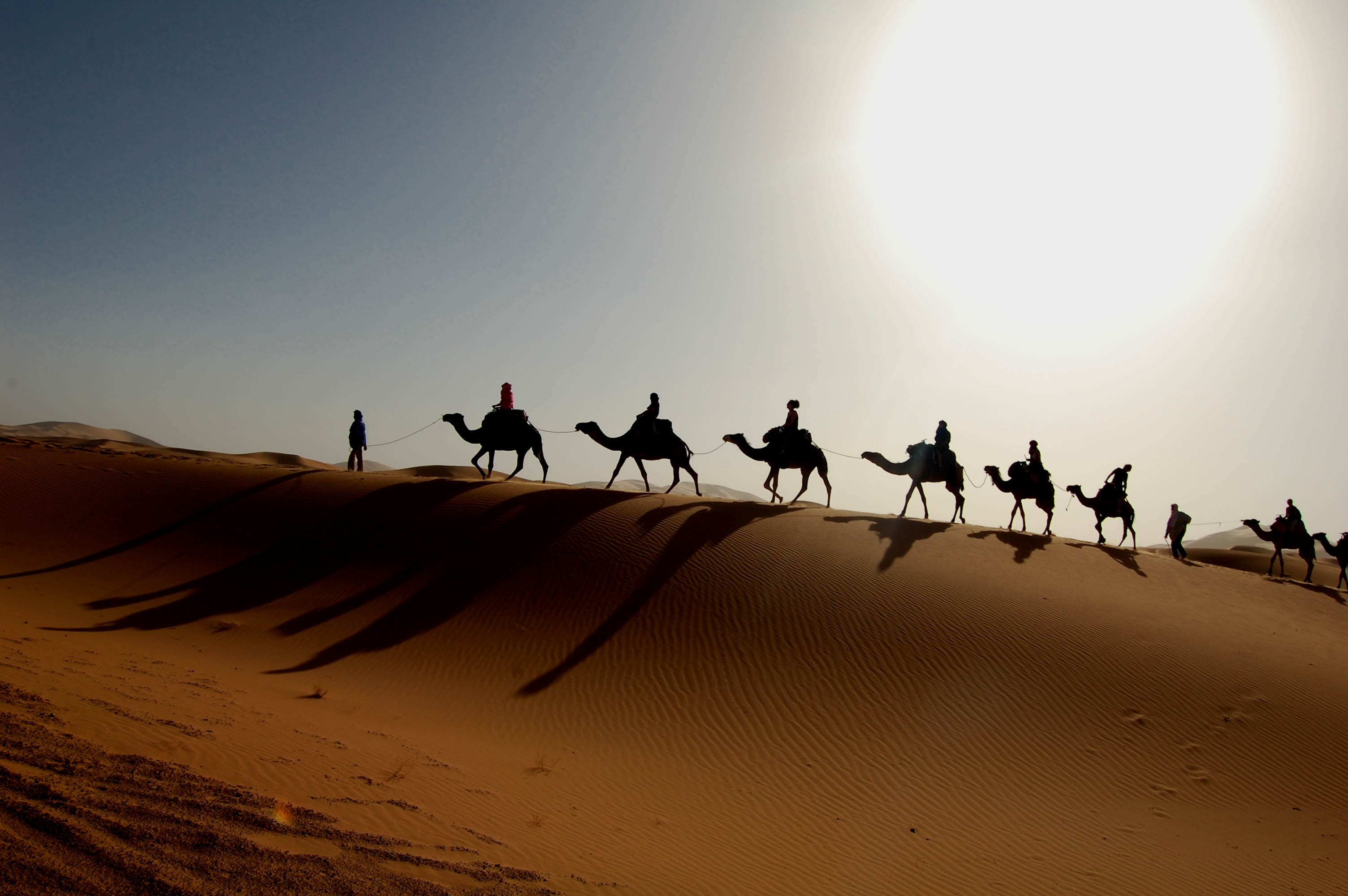
Camel rides in the Sahara, Morocco

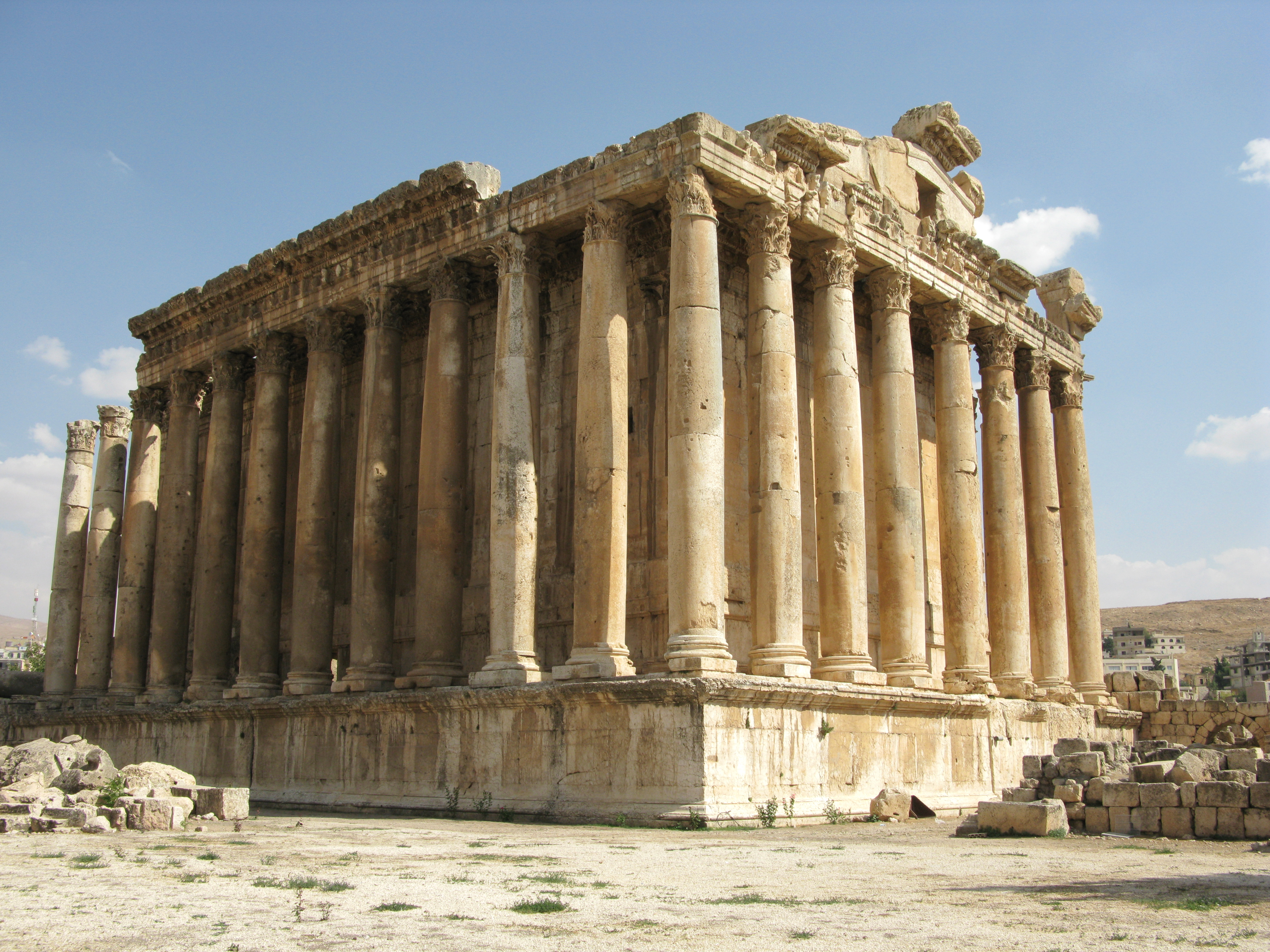
Roman Temples of Baalbek, Lebanon

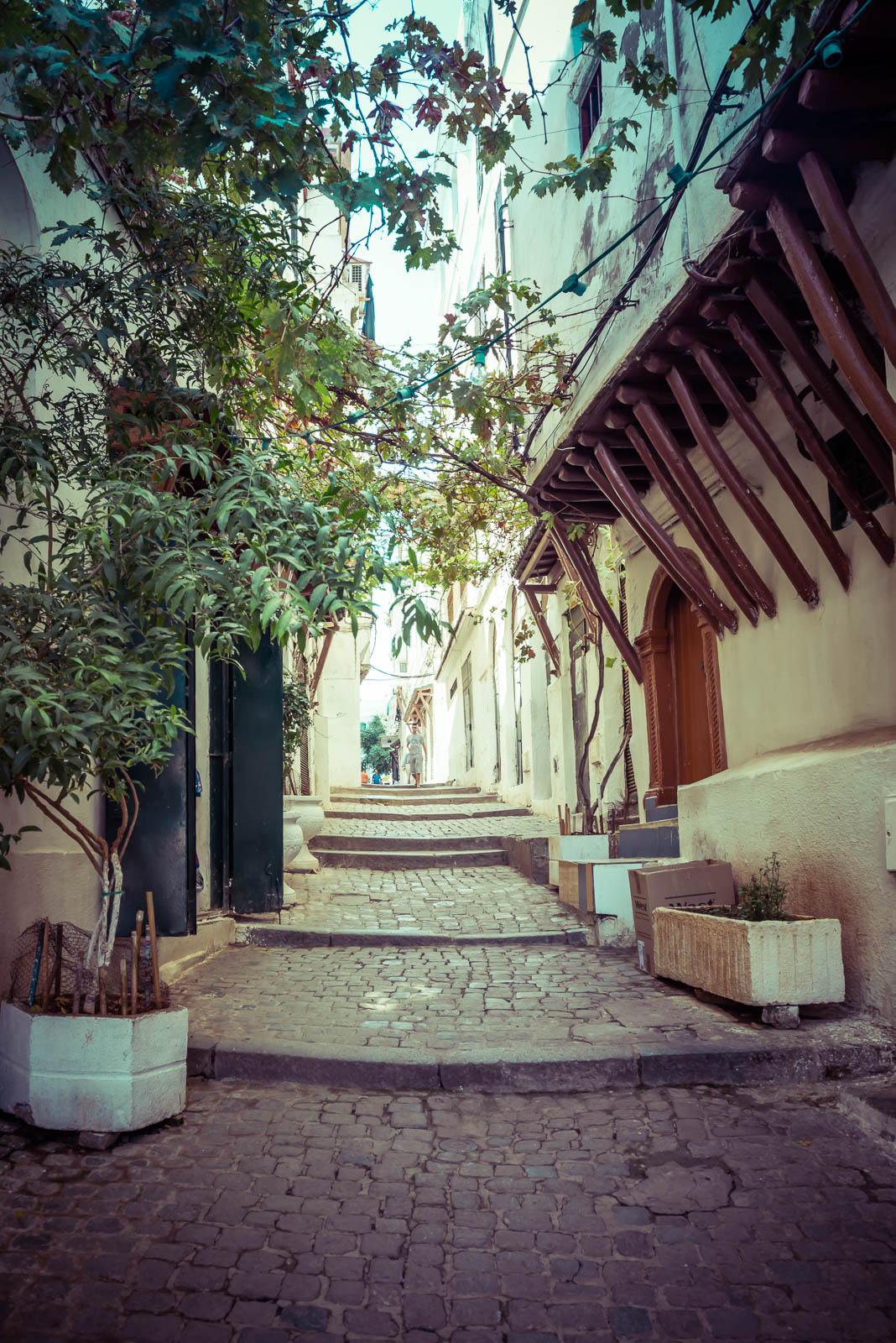
Casbah of Algiers, Algeria

Tourism in the Arab World encompasses a wide array of activities and tourist attractions in an area spanning more than 13 million square kilometers. The Arab World mainly consists of the Arabic-speaking countries and populations in North Africa and Western Asia. The standard definition of the Arab world comprises the 22 countries and territories of the Arab League: 10 countries in Africa, and 12 countries in Asia. Geographically, it stretches from the Atlantic Ocean in the west to the Arabian Sea in the east, and from the Mediterranean Sea in the north to the Horn of Africa and the Indian Ocean in the southeast. It has a combined population of around 422 million people.

The Arab World is divided into five main geographic regions: the Maghreb in Northwest Africa, the Nile Valley and the Horn of Africa in Northeast Africa, the Levant in the eastern Mediterranean, and the Arabian Peninsula in southwestern Asia. Egypt is the only transcontinental country by virtue of the Sinai Peninsula, which lies in Asia.

The vast area covered by the Arab World encompasses wide and diverse geographical features ranging from deserts and shrublands to Mediterranean forests and snow-capped mountain ranges. Deserts reign in most of northern Africa where the Sahara exists, the world's hottest desert where some of the sand dunes can reach 180 metres (590 feet) in height. The Arabian Peninsula is mainly covered by a range of deserts: the Nefud in the north, which is a stony desert; the Rub' Al-Khali or "Great Arabian Desert" in the south, and between them, the Dahna desert. In contrast, the Arab World boasts some of the highest mountain ranges in both Africa and Asia. The Atlas Mountains rise from the northern Sahara to peak of 4,167 m before cascading east towards the Mediterranean and west towards the Atlantic Ocean. The Hijaz mountains rise parallel to the Red Sea on the western edge of the Arabian Peninsula, separating the coastline from the inland deserts. Mountains like the Mount Lebanon and the Taurus Mountains mark the edges of the Levant, providing heavy rainfall and snowfall, thus nurturing the areas' forest landscapes.

The areas within the Arab World witnessed the first forms of civilization, specifically in Ancient Egypt, the Levant and Mesopotamia. Throughout history, numerous civilizations, both local and foreign, settled in and ruled the Arab World each of them leaving its trace of monuments and landmarks. This made the regions within the Arab World a mosaic of remnants from most of the civilizations of the Old World. In some countries, you can find Ancient Roman temples next to an Umayyad palace, or a Crusader castle in a Mamluk old town, or even an Eastern Orthodox Church next to an Ottoman mosque.

== Maghreb ==
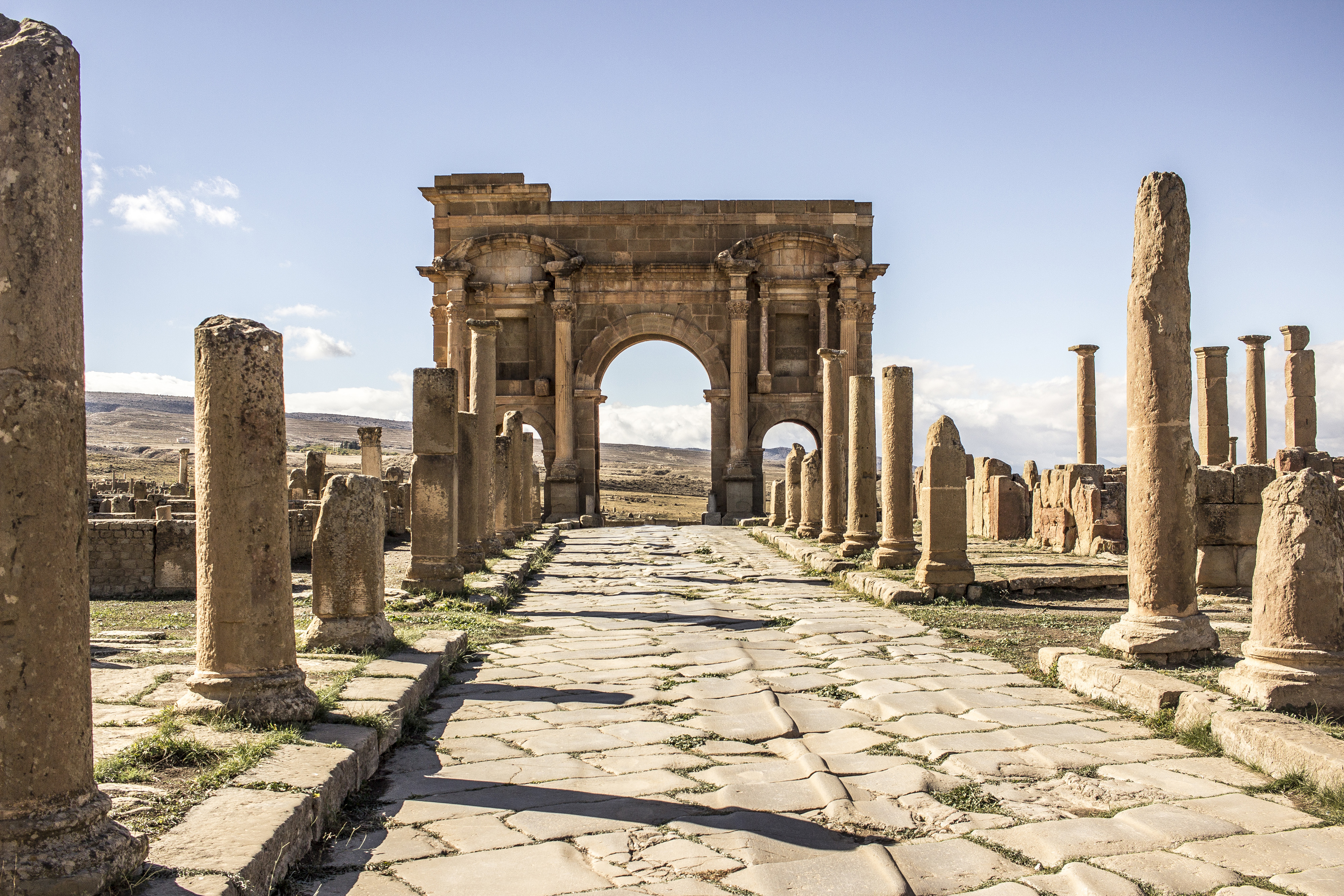
Timgad, Algeria

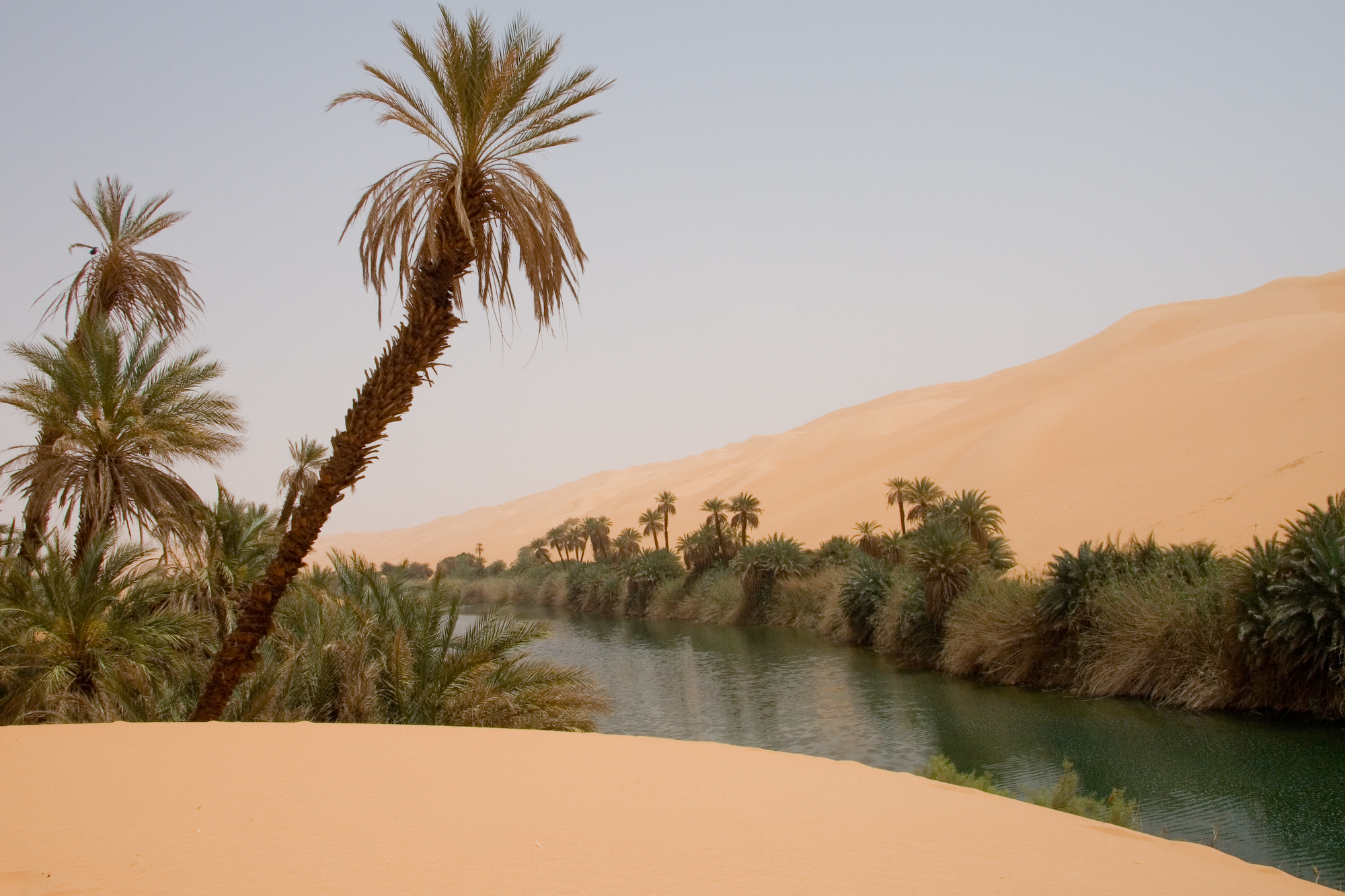
Oasis in Ubari, Libya

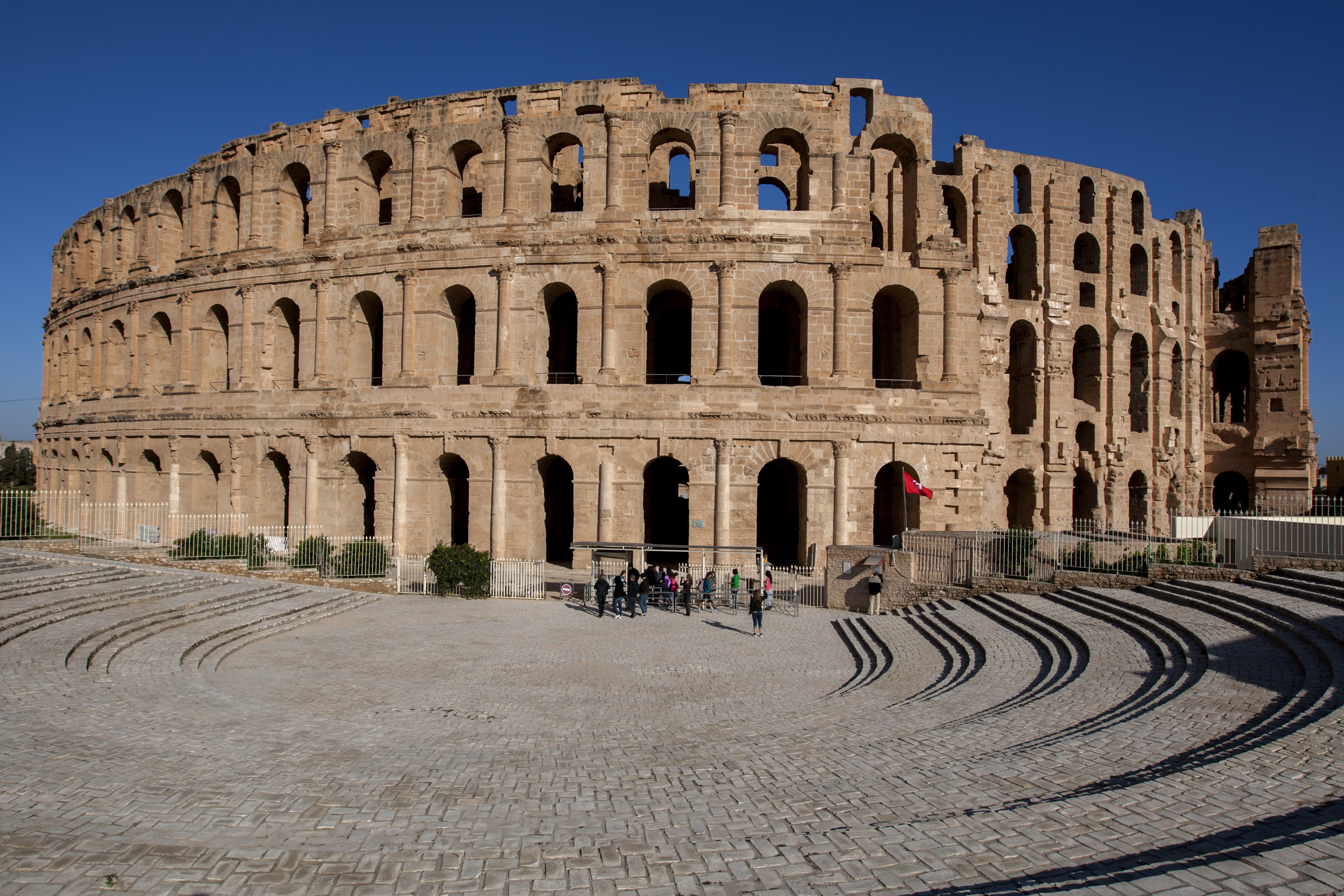
El Djem amphitheater, Tunisia

The Maghreb is usually defined as much or most of the region of Northwest Africa, west of Egypt. The traditional definition as being the region including the Atlas Mountains and the coastal plains of Algeria, Morocco, Tunisia, Mauritania and Libya. The term maghrib is in origin an Arabic word for "west", denoting the westernmost territories that fell to the Islamic conquests of the 7th century. Partially isolated from the rest of the continent by the Atlas Mountains and the Sahara desert, inhabitants of the northern parts of the Maghreb have long had commercial and cultural ties to the inhabitants of the Mediterranean countries of Southern Europe and Western Asia, going back at least to the Phoenicians in the 1st millennium BC (the Phoenician colony of Carthage having been founded, according to tradition, in what is now Tunisia c. 800 BC). The region was somewhat unified as an independent political entity during the rule of the Berber kingdom of Numidia, which was followed by Roman Empire's rule or influence. That was followed by the brief invasion of the Germanic Vandals, the equally brief re-establishment of a weak Byzantine rule by the Byzantine Empire, the rule of the Islamic Caliphates under the Umayyads, the Abbasids, and the Fatimids. The most enduring rule was that of the local Berber Muslim empires of Almoravids, Almohads, Hammadids, Zirids, Marinids, Wattasids (to name some of those among the most prominent) during the 8th to 13th centuries. The Ottoman Turks ruled the region as well.

In 1989, the five modern states of Northwest Africa established the Maghreb Union to promote cooperation and economic integration in a common market.

Maghreb is home to 1 percent of the global population as of 2010. Maghrebi people include Moroccans (along with Sahrawis), Algerians, Libyans, Mauritanians, and Tunisians. Maghrebis are largely composed of Berber and Arab descent with European and Sub-Saharan elements.

Various other influences are also prominent throughout the Maghreb. In northern coastal towns, in particular, several waves of European immigrants influenced the population in the Medieval era. Most notable were the moriscos and muwallads, that is, the indigenous Spaniards who had earlier converted to the Muslim faith and were fleeing, together with ethnic Arab and Berber Muslims, from the Spanish Catholic Reconquista. Other European contributions included French, Italians, and others captured by the corsairs. Another significant group are Turks who came over with the expansion of the Ottoman Empire. A large Turkish descended population exists, particularly in Tunisia and Algeria.

The impact of all these superimposed cultures are noticeable in the diverse culture of the Maghreb, as well as in its architecture, heritage, and cuisine.

=== Tunisia ===
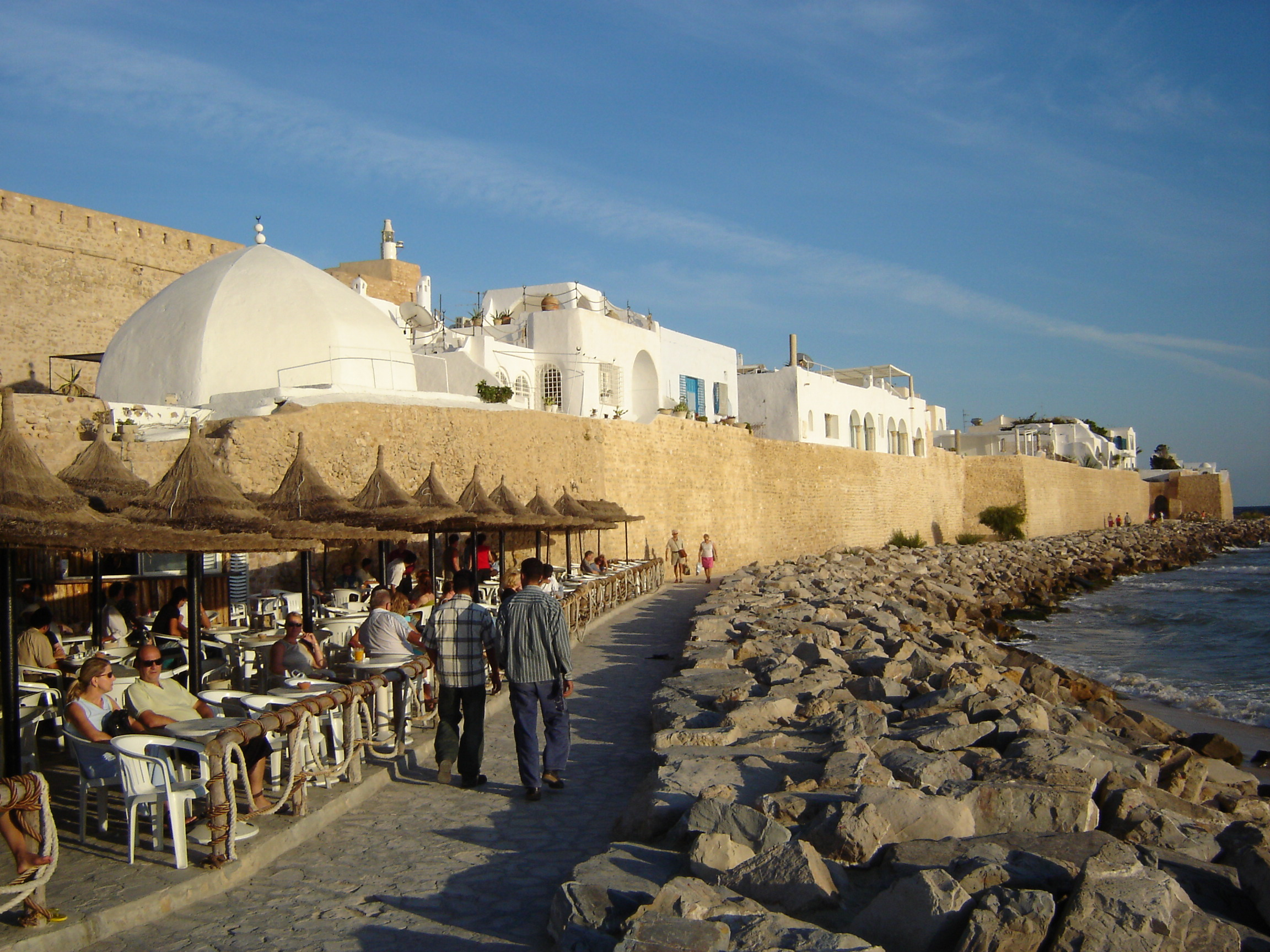
Hammamet, Tunisia

Tunisia is the smallest country in North Africa with an area of almost 165,000 square kilometres (64,000 mi^{2}) and an estimated population of just under 10.7 million. Its name is derived from the capital Tunis located in the northeast. The south of the country is composed of the Sahara desert, with much of the remainder consisting of particularly fertile soil and 1,300 kilometres (810 miles) of coastline along the Mediterranean. Tunisia's climate is temperate in the north, with mild rainy winters and hot, dry summers. Until recently, Tunisia's main attraction was on its northeast coastline around Tunis; however, the Seventh National Development Plan of 1989 created several new tourist areas around the country. The tourism sector now represents 6.5% of Tunisia's GDP and provides 340,000 jobs of which 85,000 are direct jobs, or 11.5% of the working population with a high share of seasonal employment. This sector is popular mainly on the east coast, totaling more than 95% of beds. At the heart of the city lies the Medina of Tunis, built on a gentle hill sloping towards the Tunis Lake, a historical heart of the city and home to many monuments, including palaces, such as the Dar Ben Abdallah and Dar Hussein, the mausoleum of Tourbet el Bey or many mosques such as Zitouna Mosque. Inside the Medina lie the souks, a network of covered streets lined with shops and traders and artisans ordered by specialty. Clothing merchants, perfumers, fruit sellers, booksellers and wool merchants have goods at the souks, while fishmongers, blacksmiths and potters tend to be relegated to the periphery of the markets. Another popular destination is Carthage, a 3,000-year-old Phoenician colony and capital of the ancient Carthaginian Empire. Hammamet is a famous coastal destination due to its beaches and suitability for swimming and water sports. Sousse's center is designated as a World Heritage Site, with the citrus Orchards and olive groves surrounding the old town are backed by long stretches of sandy shores.

=== Algeria ===
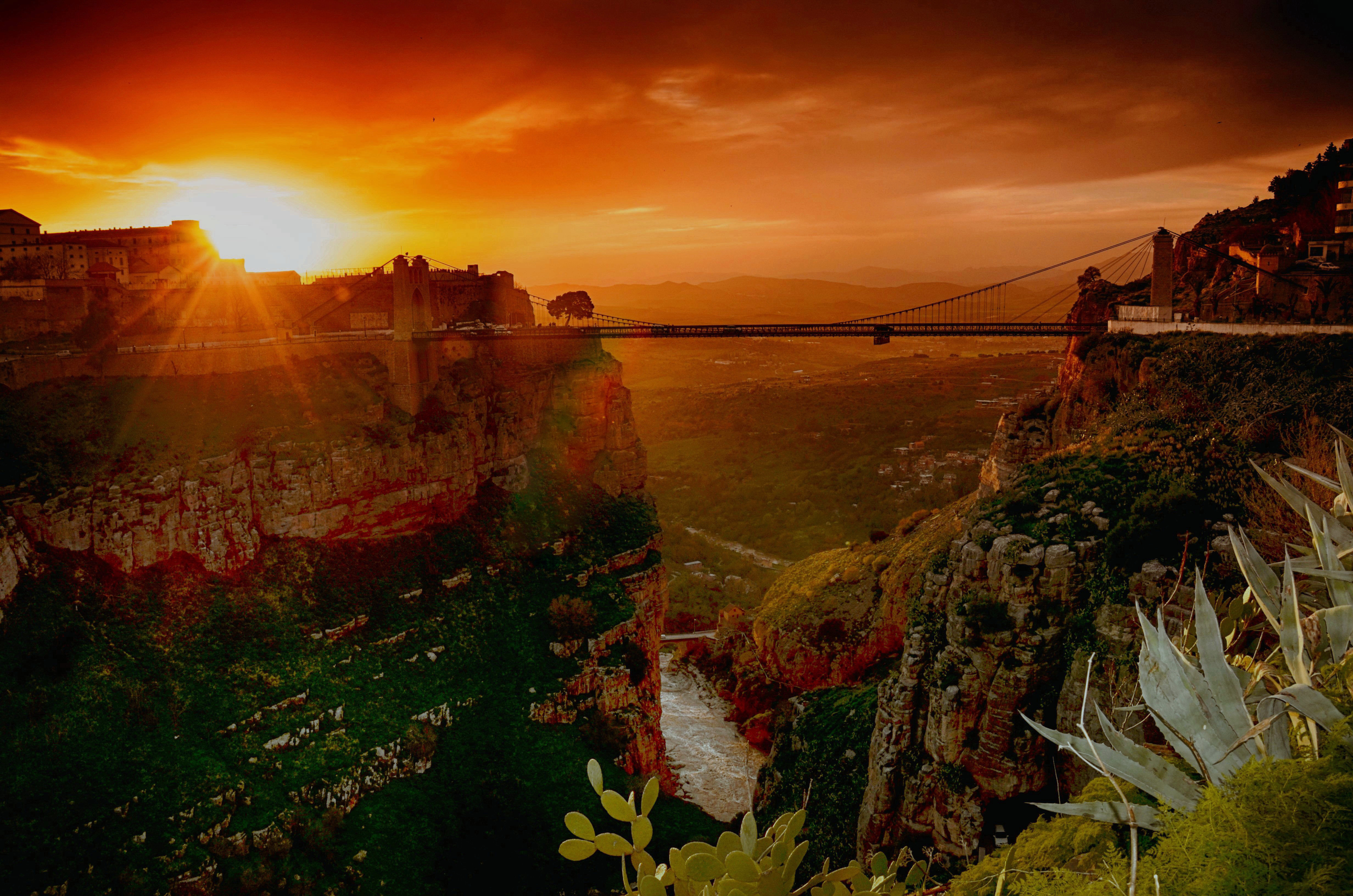
Constantine, Algeria

Algeria is the tenth-largest country in the world, and the largest in Africa and in the Mediterranean Basin, with a total area of 2,381,741 square kilometres (919,595 mi^{2}). The territory of today's Algeria was the home of many ancient prehistoric cultures, including Aterian and Capsian cultures. Its area has known many empires and dynasties, including ancient Berber Numidians, Carthaginians, Romans, Vandals, Byzantines, Arab Umayyads, Berber Fatimids, Berber Almoravids, Berber Almohads and later Turkish Ottomans. Algeria's southern part includes a significant portion of the Sahara. To the north, the Tell Atlas form with the Saharan Atlas, further south, two parallel sets of reliefs in approaching eastbound, and between which are inserted vast plains and highlands. Both Atlas tend to merge in eastern Algeria. The vast mountain ranges of Aures and Nememcha occupy the entire northeastern Algeria and are delineated by the Tunisian border. The highest point is Mount Tahat (3,003 m). There are several UNESCO World Heritage Sites in Algeria including Al Qal'a of Beni Hammad, the first capital of the Hammadid empire; Tipasa, a Phoenician and later Roman town; and Djémila and Timgad, both Roman ruins; M'Zab Valley, a limestone valley containing a large urbanized oasis; also the Casbah of Algiers is an important citadel. The only natural World Heritage Sites is the Tassili n'Ajjer, a mountain range. Algiers is the country's cosmopolitan capital, displaying much of the French Architectural heritage due to years of colonization. The modern part of the city is built on the level ground by the seashore; the old part, the ancient city of the deys, climbs the steep hill behind the modern town and is crowned by the casbah or citadel, 122 metres (400 feet) above the sea. The casbah and the two quays form a triangle. The city is sometimes nicknamed "Alger la Blanche" ("Algiers the White") because of the glistening white of its colonial-era buildings as seen rising up from the sea.

== Horn of Africa ==
=== Djibouti ===
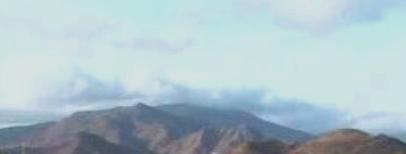
The Arrei Mountains.

Djibouti is a country located in the Horn of Africa. It is bordered by Eritrea in the north, Ethiopia in the west and south, and Somalia in the southeast. The remainder of the border is formed by the Red Sea and the Gulf of Aden at the east. Djibouti occupies a total area of just 23,200 km^{2} (9,000 sq mi). In antiquity, the territory was part of the Land of Punt. The Djibouti area, along with other localities in the Horn region, was later the seat of the medieval Adal Sultunate and Ifat Sultanate. In the late 19th century, the colony of French Somaliland was established following treaties signed by the ruling Somali and Afar Sultans with the French. Djibouti is a multi-ethnic nation, with a population of over 790,000 inhabitants. The Somali and Afar make up the two largest ethnic groups. Both speak Afro-Asiatic languages, which serve as recognized national languages. Arabic and French constitute the country's two official languages. About 94% of residents adhere to Islam, a religion with a long-standing presence in the region. There is not much seasonal variation in Djibouti's climate. Hot conditions prevail year-round along with winter rainfalls. Mean daily maximum temperatures range from 32 to 41 °C (90 to 106 °F), except at high elevations, where the effects of a cold offshore current can be felt. The Goda Mountains lie northwest of the Gulf of Tadjoura, Tadjoura Region in Djibouti. They rise to 1,750 metres (5,740 feet) above sea level and are the nation's largest heavily vegetated area. The ecology of this landform is considered an isolated outlier of the Ethiopian montane forest ecological zone, an important island of forest in a sea of semi-desert. Lake Assal (literally translated to "honey lake") is a crater lake in central-eastern Djibouti. It is a saline lake which lies 155 m (509 ft) below sea level in the Afar Triangle, making it the lowest point on land in Africa and the third lowest land depression on Earth after the Dead Sea and Sea of Galilee. There is no outflow from the lake and, due to high evaporation, the salinity level of its waters is ten times that of the sea, making it the most saline in the world after Don Juan Pond.

=== Somalia ===
Tourism in Somalia was traditionally noted for its numerous historical sites, beaches, waterfalls, mountain ranges and national parks. In the pre-independence period, European explorers would occasionally travel to Somalia and other parts of the Horn of Africa to visit the region's numerous historical sites described in old documents like the 1st century CE Periplus of the Erythraean Sea.

Following Somalia's independence in 1960, the Ministry of Tourism was established in order to regulate the national tourist industry. In 1969, the Law on Fauna (Hunting) and Forest Conservation was passed, which defined and provided for the establishment of controlled areas, game reserves and partial game reserves. It was later amended in 1978.

Tourism in Somalia is today regulated by the reconstituted national Ministry of Tourism. The autonomous Puntland and Somaliland regions maintain their own tourist offices. Headquartered in Mogadishu, the Somali Tourism Association (SOMTA) also provides consulting services from within the country on the national tourist industry.

Due to the long absence of governmental regulation, it is uncertain how many international inbound tourists visit Somalia per year. However, visas and stay permits are now mandatory for all foreign nationals. As of April 2013, the re-established Somali Immigration Department requires all undocumented foreigners to register at its offices in the capital.

== Indian Ocean islands ==
=== Comoros ===
Comoros is a sovereign archipelago island nation in the Indian Ocean, located at the northern end of the Mozambique Channel off the eastern coast of Africa, between northeastern Mozambique and northwestern Madagascar. Other countries near the Comoros are Tanzania to the northwest and the Seychelles to the northeast. Its capital city is Moroni, situated on Grande Comore the largest island in the archipelago. As a nation formed at a crossroads of many civilizations, the archipelago is noted for its diverse culture and history. The Union of the Comoros has three official languages – Comorian, Arabic and French. Officially, in addition to many smaller islands, the country consists of the four major islands in the volcanic Comoros archipelago: northwesternmost Grande Comore (Ngazidja); Mohéli (Mwali); Anjouan (Nzwani); and southeasternmost Mayotte (Maore). Although the Comoros has many natural resources for tourism, such as its beaches and marine environment, it does not have as strong a tourist industry as its regional competitors Réunion, Mauritius, and Seychelles. Its weak tourist industry is mainly because of its insecure political climate, with many political upheavals over the past three decades. Tourists in the Comoros are mainly wealthy Americans and Europeans, while much of the investment in hotels has come from South Africa. The main tourist attractions in the Comoros are its beaches, underwater fishing, and mountain scenery. Mohéli is a picturesque tourist attraction. Grand Comore has an international airport and most of the Comoros' few hotels.

== Levant ==
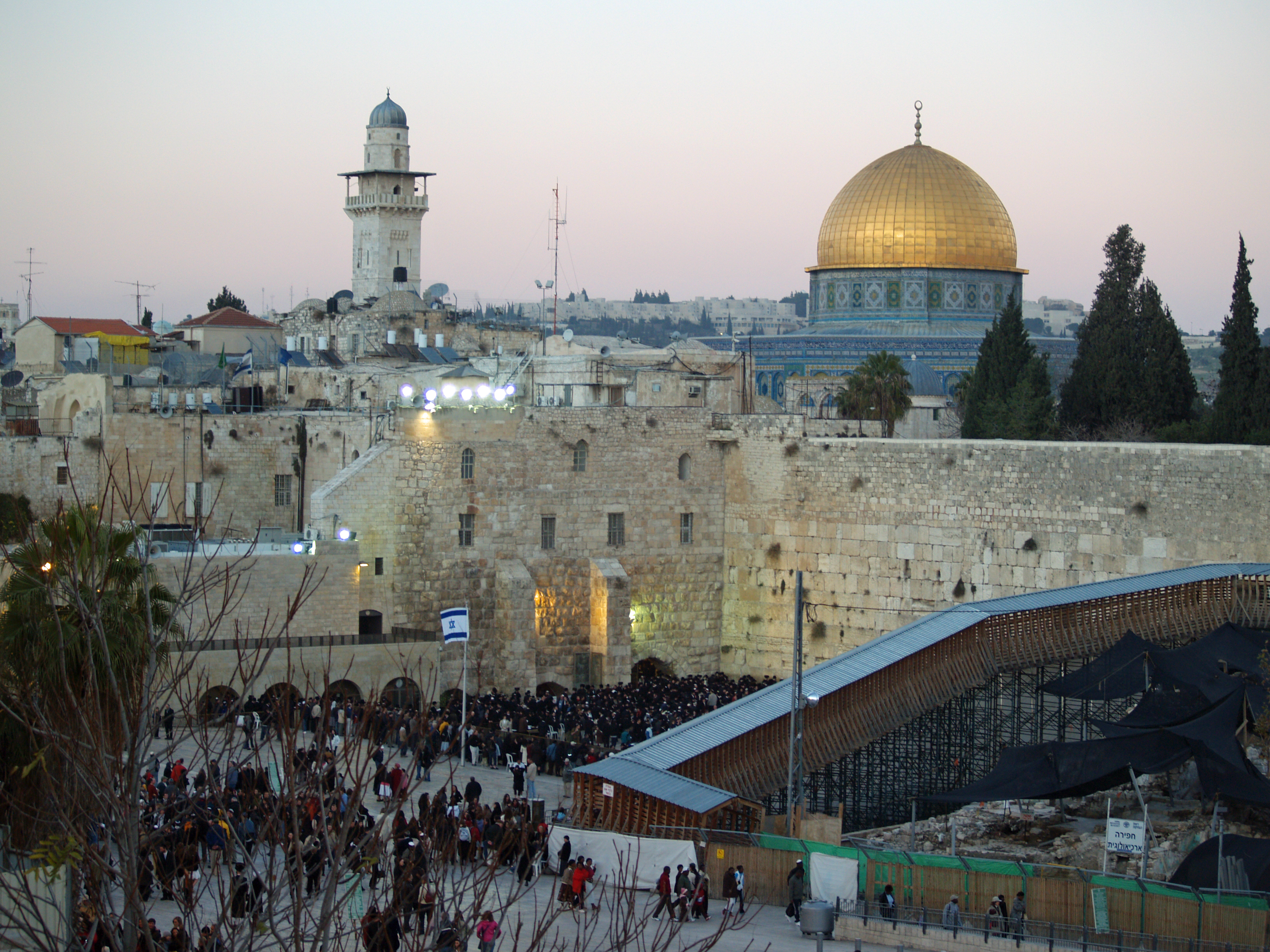
alquds

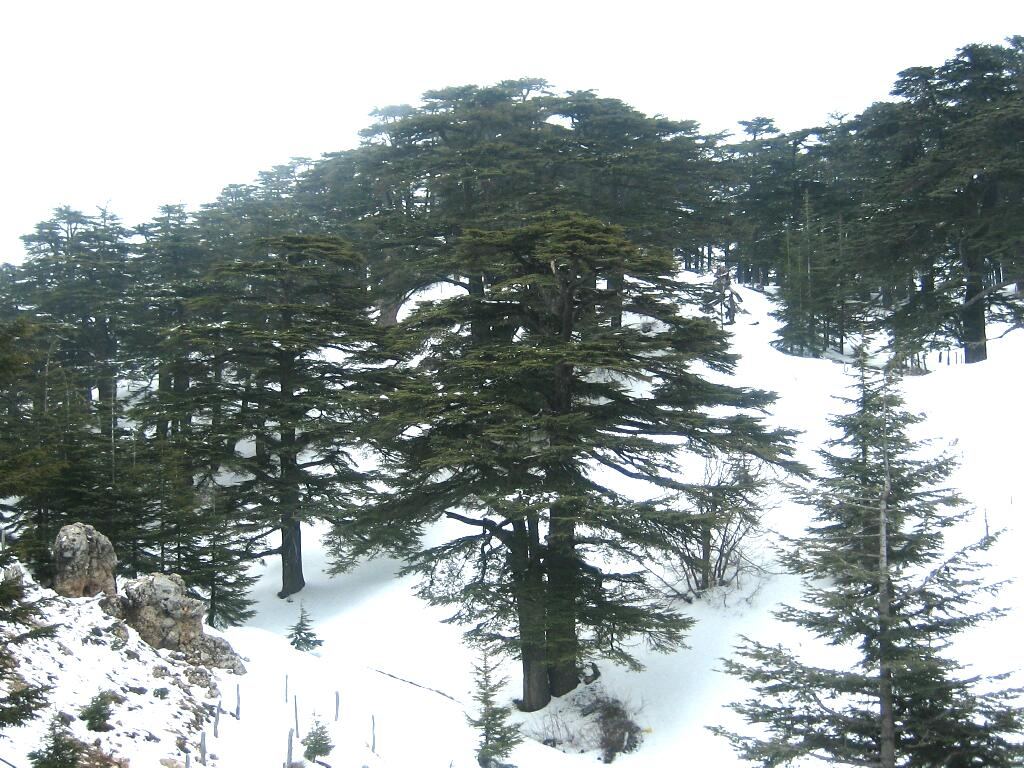
"Cedars of God" Forest, Lebanon

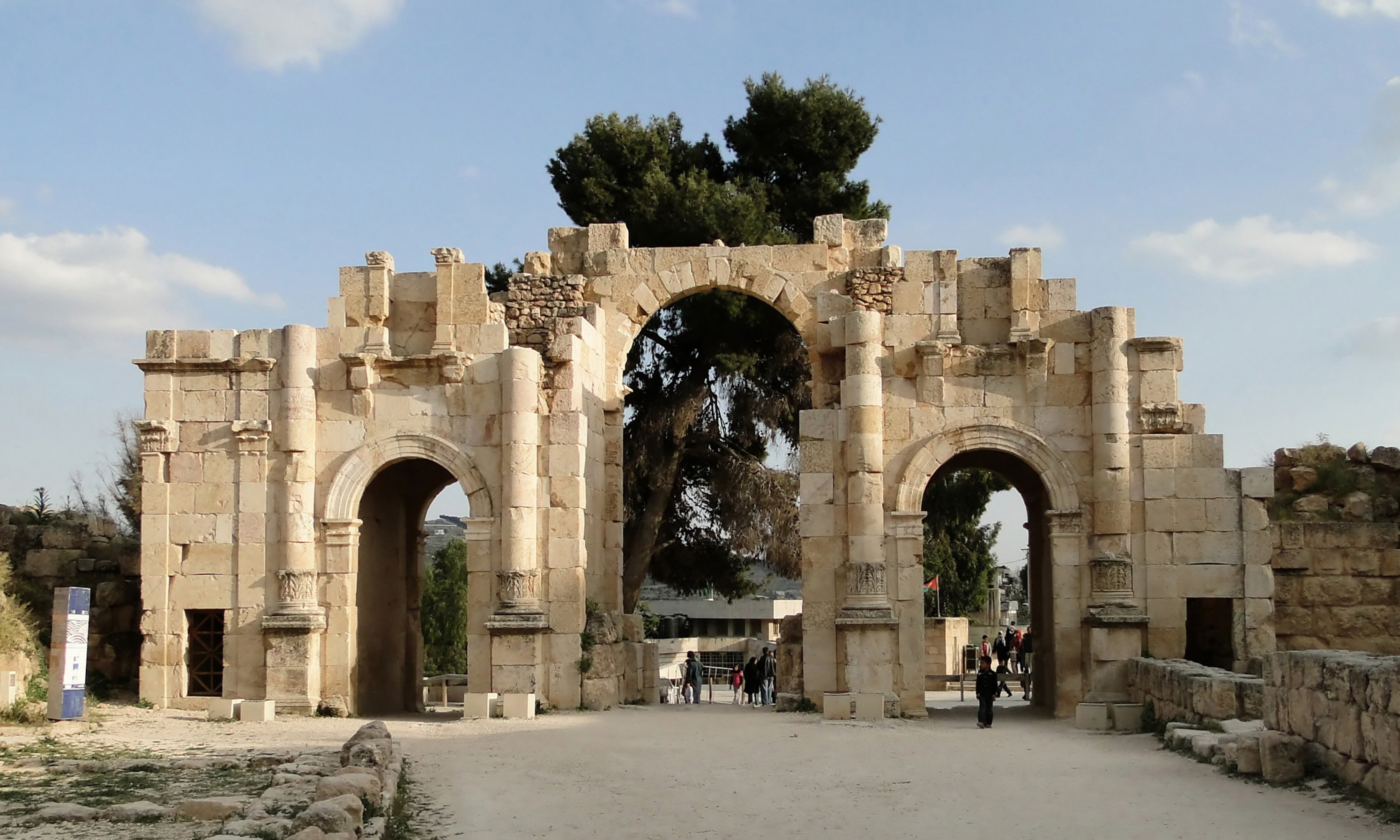
Jerash, Jordan

The Levant is the cultural and geographic region east of the Mediterranean sea, south of the Anatolian Peninsula, west of the Iranian plateau, and north of the Arabian Desert. The region has many names like the "Fertile Crescent", "Eastern Mediterranean", "Syria (region)", "Mashriq" which is the Arabic word for "Levant". The Eastern Mediterranean Muslims, Christians and Circassians speak Levantine Arabic. These populations share not only the language, but the geographic position, cuisine, some customs, and a very long history.

Geographically speaking, the Levant boasts some of the most diverse natural features in the Arab World. The Syrian Desert, a 200,000-square-miles wide rocky and flat desert, occupies the center of the Levant and is considered a continuation of the Arabian Desert. To its east lies Mesopotamia, fertile agricultural plains traversed by two rivers: Euphrates and Tigris. Both rivers originate from Anatolia and are fed by numerous tributaries; the entire river system drains a vast mountainous region. In the western Levant, hilly terrains and mountain ranges rise parallel to the Mediterranean coastline from the north to the south encompassing the: An-Nusayriyah Mountains, Lebanon Mountains, Galilee Hills, Samarian Hills, and Judaean Mountains. This mountainous barrier receives a substantial amount of precipitation and snow, and enjoys a thick forest cover, mainly Mediterranean woodlands and forests. Between the Mountains and the shoreline extends a densely populated narrow and fertile coastal plain.

The Levant is considered the Cradle of Civilization, as it witnessed the first formations of human culture. Historically, the Levant was populated and controlled by local civilizations, sometimes one controlling all others. Through the passing time, the Levant was subject to occupation by several foreign empires, mainly Persians and Romans, before falling under the control of the Byzantines after the Decline of the Roman Empire. The rise of Islam in Arabia followed by the Muslim conquests subjugated the Levant to the rule of the Rashidun Caliphate, followed by other Islamic dynasties like the Umayyads, the Abbasids, the Mamluks, and finally the Ottomans. After World War I, the Levant was divided between France and Britain according to the Sykes–Picot Agreement into spheres of influence, eventually leading to the emergence of several new states.

=== Palestine ===
The Palestinian territories refers to East Jerusalem, the West Bank, and the Gaza Strip. In 2010, 4.6 million people visited the Palestinian territories, compared to 2.6 million in 2009. Of that number, 2.2 million were foreign tourists while 2.7 million were domestic. In the last quarter of 2012 over 150,000 guests stayed in West Bank hotels; 40% were European and 9% were from the United States and Canada. Major travel guides write that "the West Bank is not the easiest place in which to travel but the effort is richly rewarded."

The Palestinian Authority and Israeli tourism ministries have attempted to work together on tourism in the Palestinian territories in a Joint Committee. Recent cooperation to share access to foreign tourists has not proven successful in Palestine for many reasons. Israel controls the movement of tourists into the West Bank. Palestinian tour guides or transportation companies have not been able to enter Israel since 2000, and in 2009, Israel's Ministry of Tourism deleted the West Bank and any Palestinian area from its materials. Former Palestinian Authority Tourism Minister Kholoud Diibes has commented "that Israel collects 90% of [religious] pilgrim-related revenue". Foreign tourism has been restricted to East Jerusalem and the West Bank since the August 2013 indefinite closing of the Rafah crossing located between Egypt and the Hamas controlled Gaza Strip. There is essentially no tourist flow to Gaza since 2005 because of the ongoing Israeli military land, sea, and air blockade.

In 2013 Palestinian Authority Tourism minister Rula Ma'ay'a stated that her government aims to encourage international visits to Palestine, but the occupation is the main factor preventing the tourism sector from becoming a major income source to Palestinians. There are no visa conditions imposed on foreign nationals other than those imposed by the visa policy of Israel. Access to Jerusalem, the West Bank, and Gaza is completely controlled by the Government of Israel. Entry to the occupied Palestinian territories requires only a valid international passport. U.S. citizens who are suspected of being Muslims, Arabs, or "being participants in planned political protest activities or of supporting NGOs that are critical of Israeli policies" are often subjected to extensive questioning from immigration officials. These groups of tourists are subject to delay, interrogation, or even, denial of access to lawyers, consular officers, and family, and denial of entry.

=== Jordan ===
Jordan is an Arab kingdom in the Middle East, on the East Bank of the River Jordan, and extending into the historic region of Palestine. Jordan borders Saudi Arabia to the south and east, Iraq to the north-east, Syria to the north and Israel to the west, sharing control of the Dead Sea with the latter. It consists of an arid plateau in the east, irrigated by oasis and seasonal water streams, with highland area in the west of arable land and Mediterranean evergreen forestry. The Jordan Rift Valley of the Jordan River separates Jordan from Palestine and Israel. The highest point in the country is Jabal Umm al Dami, at 1,854 m (6,083 ft) above sea level, its top is also covered with snow, while the lowest is the Dead Sea −420 m (−1,380 ft). The most common tourist site is Petra capital of the Nabateans, a rose-stone city carved out of the cliffs and hidden among a complex of arid narrow gorges. Another historical site is Jerash, an ancient Roman city famous for its well-preserved street grid, hippodrome, and fine colonnades. Several other towns like Al Karak and Ajloun are home to large-scale well-preserved Crusader citadels. Jordan has significant religious sites as well like the Jordan River, which is the river where Jesus was baptised by John the Baptist, Madaba, a highly religious site renowned for its mosaics, and Mount Nebo, where Moses was said to have gone to get a view of the Promised Land before he died. Aqaba is the country's only outlet to the sea. The city houses numerous resorts and hotels and is famous for its Red Sea coral reefs. Wadi Rum is a valley cut into the sandstone and granite rock in southern Jordan; it is the largest wadi in Jordan. Popular activities in this desert valley environment include camping under the stars, riding Arab horses, hiking and rock-climbing among the massive rock formations.

=== Iraq ===
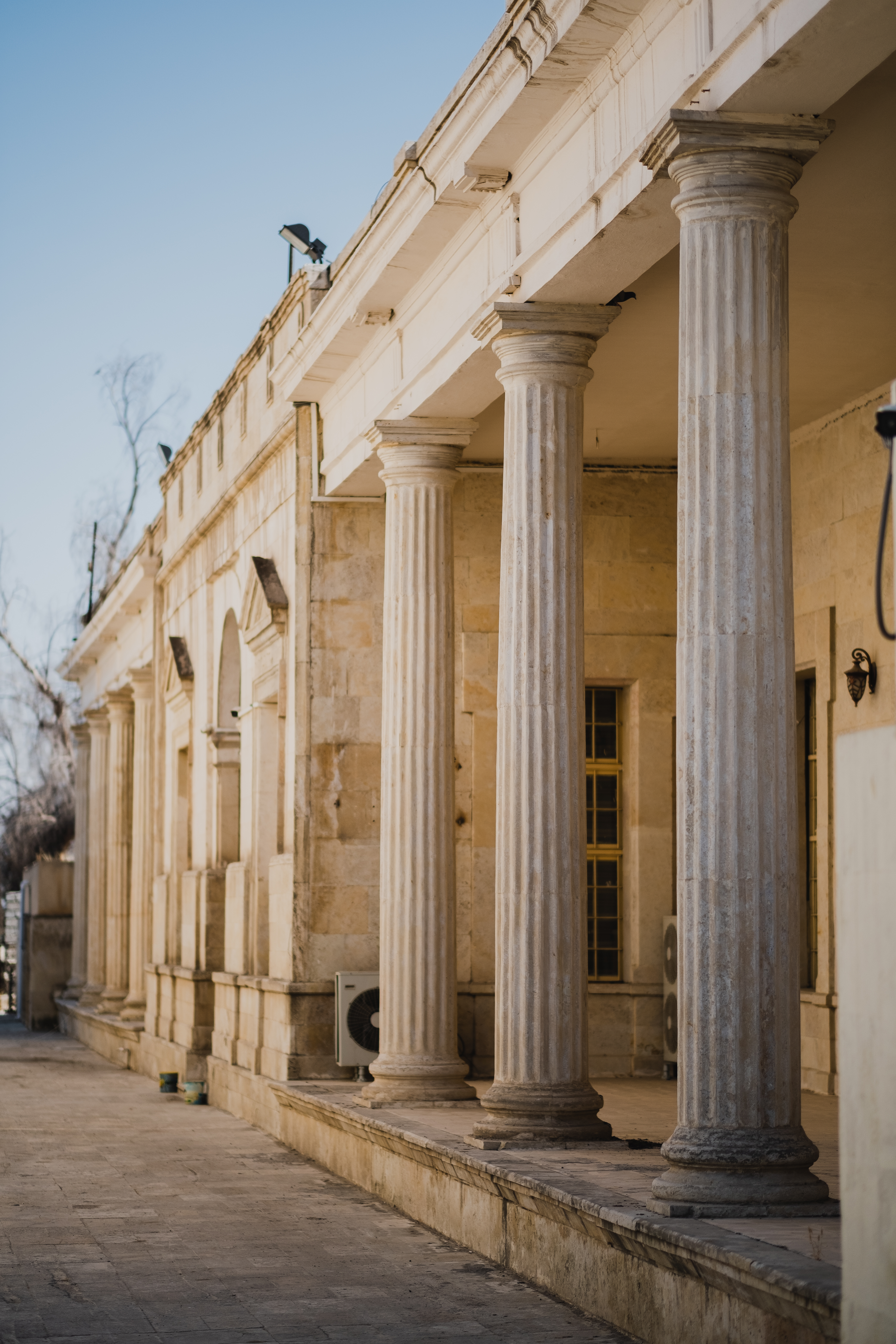
Mosul Museum is the second largest museum in Iraq after the Iraq Museum in Baghdad. It contains ancient Mesopotamian artifacts.

Iraq was an important tourist destination for many years but that changed dramatically during the war with Iran and after the 2003 invasion by US and allies. As Iraq continues to develop and stabilises, the tourism in Iraq is still facing many challenges, little has been made by the government to meet its tremendous potential as a global tourist destination, and gain the associated economic benefits, mainly due to conflicts. However, in recent years the government has made some efforts to attract tourists to the various destinations in the country and arrivals have increased. Sites from Iraq's ancient past are numerous and many that are close to large cities have been excavated. Babylon has seen major recent restoration; known for its famous Ziggurat (the inspiration for the Biblical Tower of Babel), the Hanging Gardens (one of the Seven Wonders of the World), and the Ishtar Gate, making it a prime destination. Nineveh, a rival to Babylon, has also seen significant restoration and reconstruction. Ur, one of the first Sumerian cities, which is near Nasiriyya, has been partially restored. This is a list of examples of some significant sites in a country with a tremendous archaeological and historic wealth. Iraq is considered to be a potential location for ecotourism. The tourism in Iraq includes also making pilgrimages to holy Shia sites near Karbala and Najaf.

== Arabian Peninsula ==
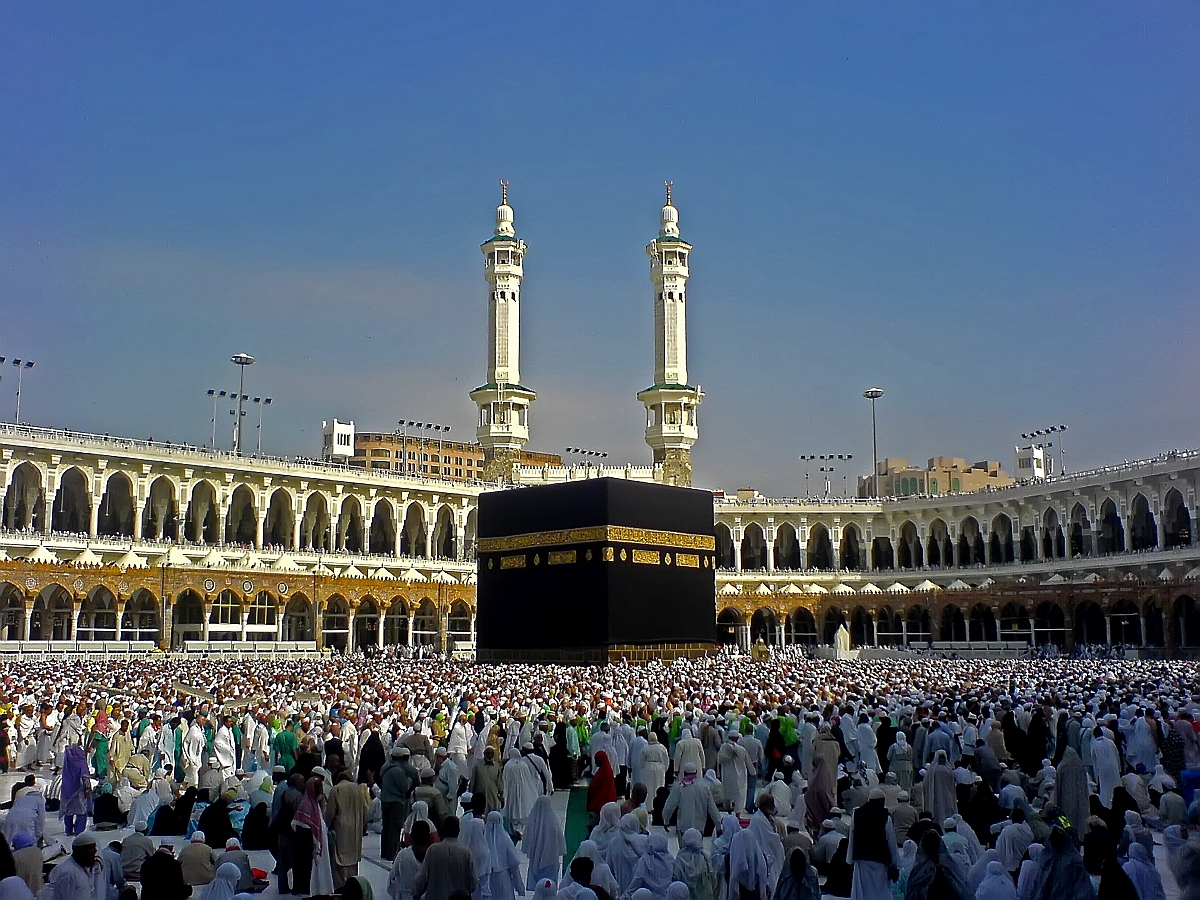
Pilgrims in Mecca

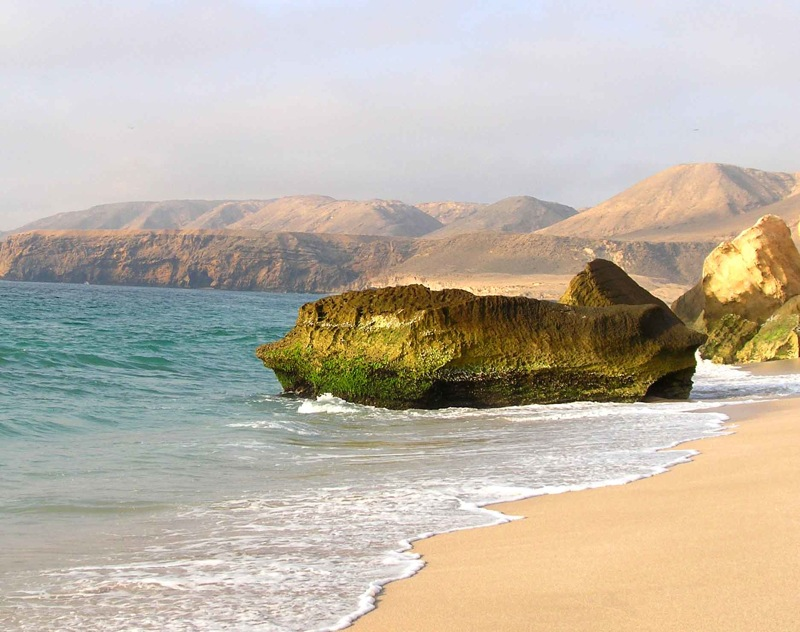
Ras al-Jinz, the easternmost point of the Arabian Peninsula

Oman

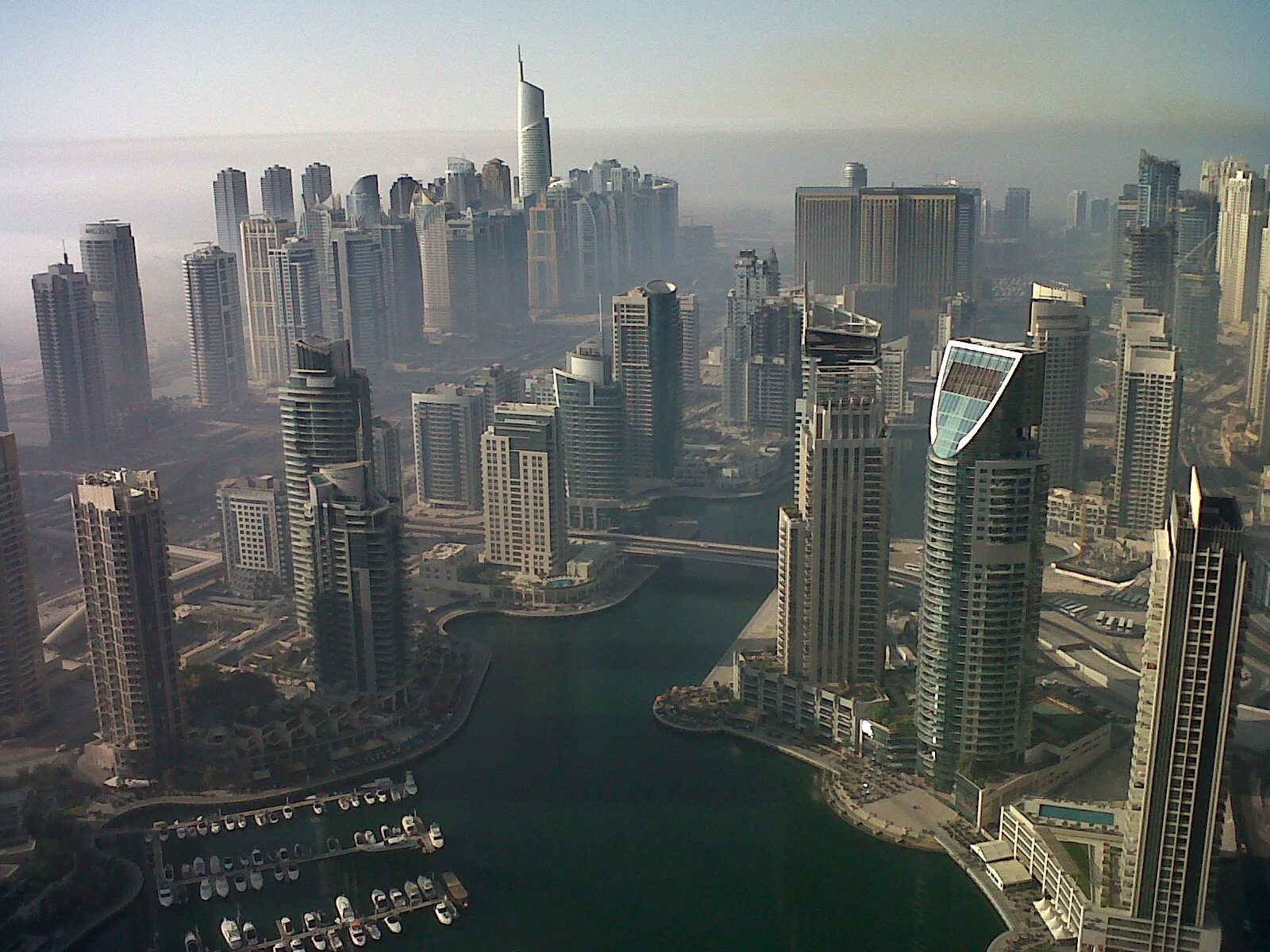
Dubai Marina, United Arab Emirates

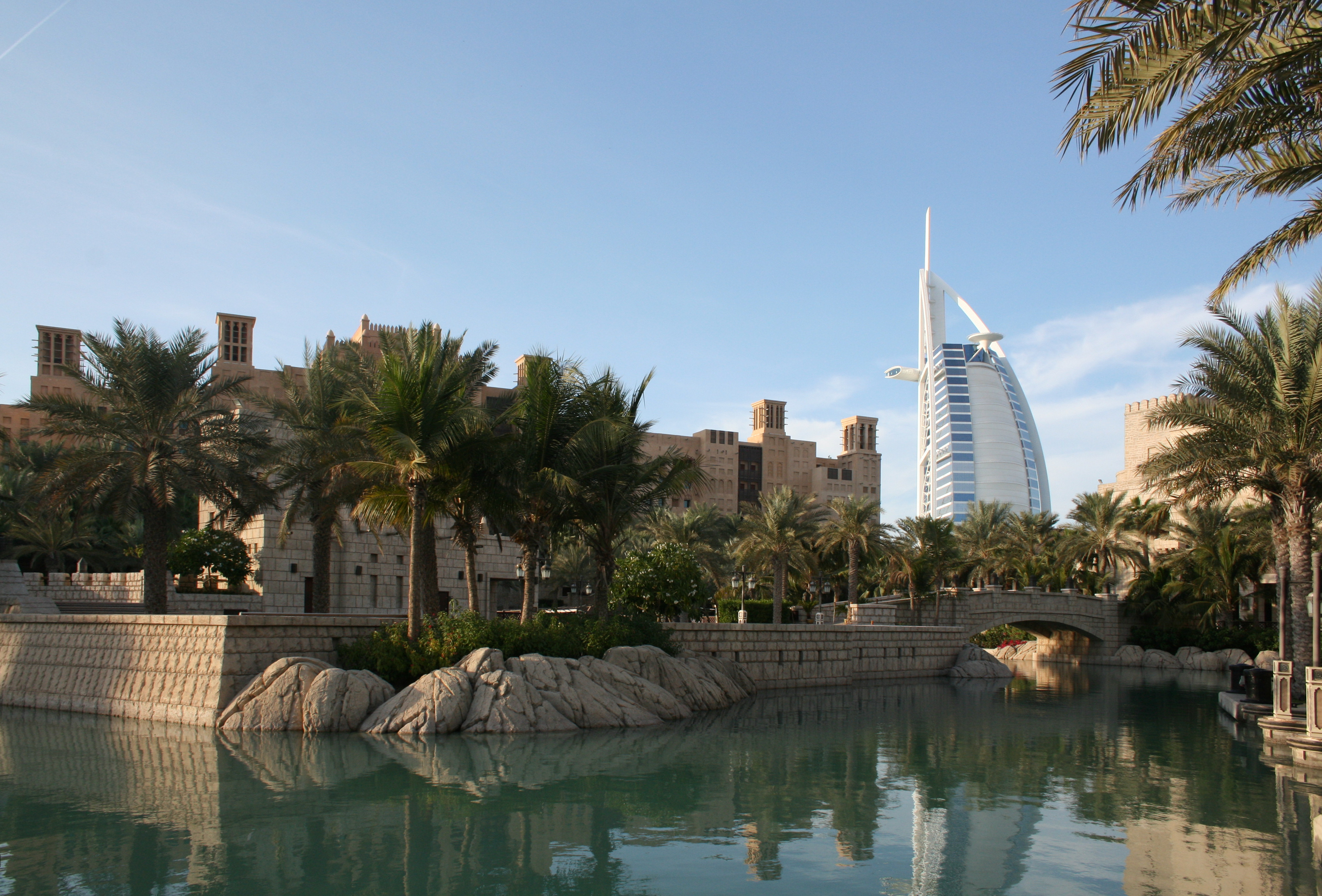
Madinat Jumeirah and Burj Al Arab

The Arabian Peninsula is a land mass situated north-east of Africa. Also known as Arabia or the Arabian subcontinent, it is the world's largest peninsula and covers 3,237,500 km^{2} (1,250,000 sq mi). The area is an important part of the Asian continent and plays a critical geopolitical role of the Middle East and Arab World due to its vast reserves of oil and natural gas. The peninsula formed as a result of the rifting of the Red Sea between 56 and 23 million years ago, and is bordered by the Red Sea to the west, the Persian Gulf to the northeast, and the Indian Ocean and Arabian Sea to the southeast.

The northern portion of the peninsula merges with the Syrian Desert with no clear border line, although the northern boundary of the Arabian Peninsula is generally considered to be the northern borders of Saudi Arabia and Kuwait. The most prominent feature of the peninsula is desert, but in the southwest there are mountain ranges which receive greater rainfall than the rest of the Arabian Peninsula.

The peninsula's constituent countries are (clockwise north to south) Kuwait, Bahrain, Qatar, and the United Arab Emirates on the east, Oman on the southeast, Yemen on the south and Saudi Arabia at the center. The island nation of Bahrain lies off the east coast of the peninsula. Six countries, including Saudi Arabia, Kuwait, Bahrain, Qatar, United Arab Emirates and Oman form the Gulf Cooperation Council (GCC), also known as the Arab states of the Persian Gulf. The Kingdom of Saudi Arabia covers the greater part of the peninsula. The majority of the population of the peninsula live in Saudi Arabia and in Yemen.

The history of the Arabian Peninsula goes back to the beginnings of human habitation in Arabia up to 20,000 years ago. The region has twice in world history had a global impact. The first was in the 7th century when it became the cradle of Islam. The second was from the mid-20th century when the discovery of vast oil deposits propelled it into a key economic and geo-political role. At other times, the region existed in relative obscurity and isolation, although from the 7th century the cities of Mecca and Medina had the highest spiritual significance for the Islamic world, Mecca being the destination for the Hajj annual pilgrimage. For much of its history most of the Arabian Peninsula has been controlled by a patchwork of tribal rulers.

=== Saudi Arabia ===
The mountains, valleys and Red Sea beaches with turquoise water are known for some of the world's finest diving and attract some, but comparatively few, tourists. Some other spots are hard to reach, such as the Nabatean ruins, a four-hour drive from Medina, the nearest city with an airport for visitors to fly into. The Kingdom is almost totally dependent on oil, a habit Prince Sultan Bin Salman wants to change by forming the Saudi Commission for Tourism & Antiquities in 2000. There are several museums in Saudi Arabia like the Royal Saudi Air Force Museum and the National Museum of Saudi Arabia. The Royal Saudi Air Force Museum or "Saqr Al-Jazira" is located on the East Ring Road of the Saudi capital Riyadh between exits 10 and 11. A Saudia Lockheed L-1011 Tristar serves as a gateguard visible from the ring road. The museum gives the history of the Royal Saudi Air Force from its establishment in the 1920s to the present day. The museum comprises an outdoor static park and a large and modern indoor museum. The National Museum of Saudi Arabia is another major national museum in Saudi Arabia. Established in 1999, it is part of the King Abdul Aziz Historical Centre in Riyadh. It covers several topics about Islam, Prophet Muhammad's journeys, and the pre-Islamic history of Arabia. Diriyah is an old town, designated as a World Heritage Site, that used to be the ruling capital of the First Saudi State. Another Major World Heritage Site is Mada'in Saleh composed of gigantic tombs and burial chambers carved out of stone cliffs with native artistic designs. Tourism in Saudi Arabia is largely based around religious pilgrimage. Mecca receives over three million pilgrims a year during the month of Hajj, and around two million during the month of Ramadan in Umrah.

=== Oman ===
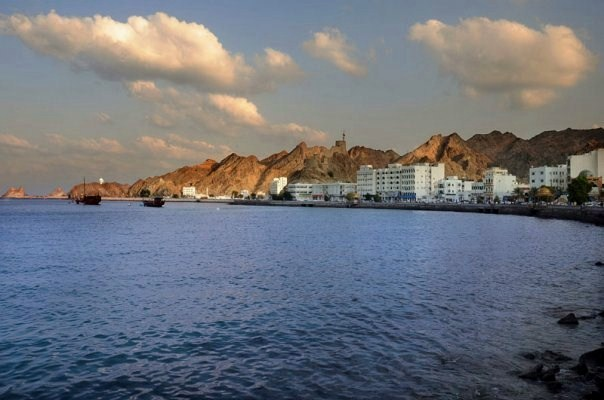
Muscat seafront, Oman

Sultanate of Oman is the easternmost country of the Arabian Peninsula. Oman's coast is lined with many soft sand beaches. Activity for beach visitors include sunning, swimming, kite-surfing, diving, snorkeling, boating, surfing, beach combing and shell collecting. The beaches are popular with families, walkers, and joggers. They are lined with restaurants, snack bars and cafes. Desert safari is becoming a very popular activity; it can be either done on camels or by four-wheel drives. Nearly every Omani city and town has its own fort. Most of them were built or had major expansions during Al-Yarubi dynasty rule of Oman in between 1624 and 1744. They represent the fine Omani architecture and prosperity at that time. In times of war and with high and thick walls, their purpose was as a refuge for the people and a last line of defense for the town. Forts were prepared to withstand long siege with water wells, food storing capacity and secret tunnels ending many kilometers away from the walls of the fort. In times of peace they served as a center of governance, a place for education and a social interaction point. Some of these famous forts are the Nakhal fort and the Bahla fort, both of which are designated as World Heritage Sites. Other World Heritage sites include the "Frankincense Route", a set of locations that collectively contributed to the flourishing of frankincense trade for many centuries., and the "Falaj", a rare 2000-year-old water system and irrigation structure. Many of Oman's old cities are still well-preserved and serve as traditional souqs. Omani Souqs (Markets) are preferable locations to purchase handicrafts and are always bustling with tourists. Omani markets are characterized by their diversity. Old markets are full of handicrafts like silver, gold, textiles and masterpieces produced by other Omani industries like daggers and coexist with modern shopping malls and other shopping centers.

=== United Arab Emirates ===
The United Arab Emirates, or UAE, is country on the southeast edge of the Arabian Peninsula, overlooking the Persian Gulf. The UAE is composed of 7 Emirates, or principalities, each ruled by a historic Arabian dynasty. The country was formed when the seven emirates decided to form a federation back in 1971, and later witnessed a huge economic and development boom with the discovery of oil. The Capital of the UAE is Abu Dhabi, while Dubai is the largest city and major financial center. The other emirates are Ajman, Fujairah, Ras al-Khaimah, Sharjah, and Umm al-Quwain. Tourism Plays a vital role in the economy of the United Arab Emirates, with the number of visitors surpassing 10 million tourists per year. Dubai maintains the highest share of tourists among the other emirates. Dubai gained a lot of media attention with ambitious mega-projects like: Burj Khalifa, the world's highest tower, The Dubai Mall, the world's biggest shopping mall, the Palm Islands, a series of three artificial palm-shaped islands, the World Islands, the man-made archipelago in the shape of the world map, Burj Al Arab, the world's only 7-star hotel, Madinat Jumeirah, a 40 hectares traditional Arabian resort town, Dubai Marina, a 3-km long canal city with the highest residential tower in the world, Dubai Fountain, Ski Dubai, Downtown Burj Dubai, among several others. Dubai also maintains some historic landmarks, dating back to the city's heritage as a small fishing and trading outpost along the Persian Gulf, like the: Dubai Creek, a saltwater inlet that was the center of Dubai's ancient trade and pearling industry, Dubai Spice Souk, the old merchants' market selling frankincense, shisha, herbs, textiles, incense, rugs and artifacts, Dubai Gold Souk, a traditional bustling Souk with over 300 gold retailers, Grand Mosque (Dubai), a century-old sandstone mosque with a 70-meters high minaret, Al Bastakiya, a well-preserved old town famous for its iconic Wind Towers, Al Ahmadiya School, one of the most ancient educational institutions, Al Fahidi Fort, an 18th-century grand Arabian Fort turned into a museum, Al Souk Al Kabir, one of the oldest residential & commercial districts in Dubai, among several other sites. The Geographic nature of the UAE provides several opportunities for tourism. The UAE enjoys a 650 km stretch of coastline along the Persian Gulf, and a significantly smaller coast along the Gulf of Oman. Most of the coast consists of salt pans that extend far inland, with several islands and coral reefs dotting the shoreline. The desert landscape inland is dominated by rolling sand dunes disrupted by a handful of oasis, like the Liwa Oasis. Abu Dhabi, the country's capital and second-largest city, boasts its share of tourist attractions as well; most importantly: Emirates Palace, a grand Arabian Palace/Hotel with a 1.3 km beachfront & 100 hectares of gardens, Ferrari World, the world's largest indoor amusement park, Yas Marina Circuit, the site of the Abu Dhabi Grand Prix, Yas Hotel Abu Dhabi, the hotel built over a section of the Formula One circuit, Abu Dhabi Corniche, a pedestrian seaside promenade along the city's coastline, Yas Island, a man-made multi-use leisure island, Sheikh Zayed Grand Mosque, a vast mosque structure composed of 82 domes and is entirely covered with white marble.

=== Bahrain ===
Bahrain contains an area of 718 km2 and a population of around 700,000

=== Qatar ===
Qatar is a peninsular Arab country whose terrain comprises arid desert and a long Persian Gulf shoreline of beaches and dunes. Capital Doha is known for its futuristic skyscrapers and other ultramodern architecture inspired by ancient Islamic design, such as the limestone Museum of Islamic Art, which is situated on the city's Corniche waterfront promenade.

=== Kuwait ===
Kuwait holds vast oil fields and for its tourism mostly focuses on its history with the gulf war.

=== Statistics ===
Number of tourists in 2024 by country:

- Saudi Arabia 17.5 million
- Morocco 17.4 million
- Egypt 17 million
- United Arab Emirates 16.7 million
- Tunisia 9.4 million
- Jordan 4.5 million
- Bahrain 3.8 million
- Oman 2.5 million
- Algeria 2.4 million
- Qatar 2.1 million
- Lebanon 1.9 million
- Iraq 1.5 million
- Sudan 813,000
- Palestine 606,000
- Syria 170,000
- Mauritania 1,500
