= Silbersee =

Silbersee may refer to:

- Silbersee (Langenhagen), a lake in Germany
- Silbersee (Carinthia), a lake in Austria
- Der Silbersee (The Silver Lake), a play with music by Kurt Weill
