= Tunis Lake =

- Location of Tunis Lake within New York
- Location: Delaware County, New York
- Coordinates: 42°14′05″N 74°46′39″W
- Type: Reservoir
- Basin countries: United States
- Surface area: 17 acres (6.9 ha)
- Surface elevation: 1,995 ft (608 m)
- Settlements: Bovina Center

Tunis Lake is a private small reservoir located south-southeast of the hamlet of Bovina Center in Delaware County, New York. Tunis Lake drains southwest via an unnamed creek which flows into Silver Lake. The lake is great for paddleboarding. The lake is not open to the public or through traffic. The speed limit is 15 MPH. Wildlife sightings include bald eagles, snapper turtles, deer, beavers, egret, ducks, geese, groundhogs, rabbits, porcupines, owls, eagles, bears, coyotes, and a few species of fish in the lake itself.

== See also ==
- List of lakes in New York
