= Silver Lake (Clay County, Minnesota) =

Lake in the state of Minnesota, United States

- Location within Minnesota Location within the United States
- Location: Clay County, Minnesota, United States
- Coordinates: 46.8309°N 96.3341°W
- Type: Natural
- Basin countries: United States
- Surface area: 114 acres (0.46 km^{2})
- Max. depth: 39 ft (12 m)
- Islands: 0
- Settlements: Hawley

Silver Lake is a small freshwater prairie lake in Northwestern Minnesota. It is located three miles (5 km) south of the town of Hawley.

The lake has one public access located off County Road 12 which includes a boat ramp, small grass beach. and parking for around 1 vehicles. Its proximity to the Fargo-Moorhead metro area and the lakes' area makes it attractive for recreational use. It sees relatively heavy use for activities such as fishing, swimming, and water sports. The lake contains several species of game fish including bluegill, northernpike, largemouth bass and walleye.

Silver Lake was named for its shiny surface.
