= Silver Lake (Whatcom County, Washington) =

Lake in Whatcom County, Washington

- Fish Lake
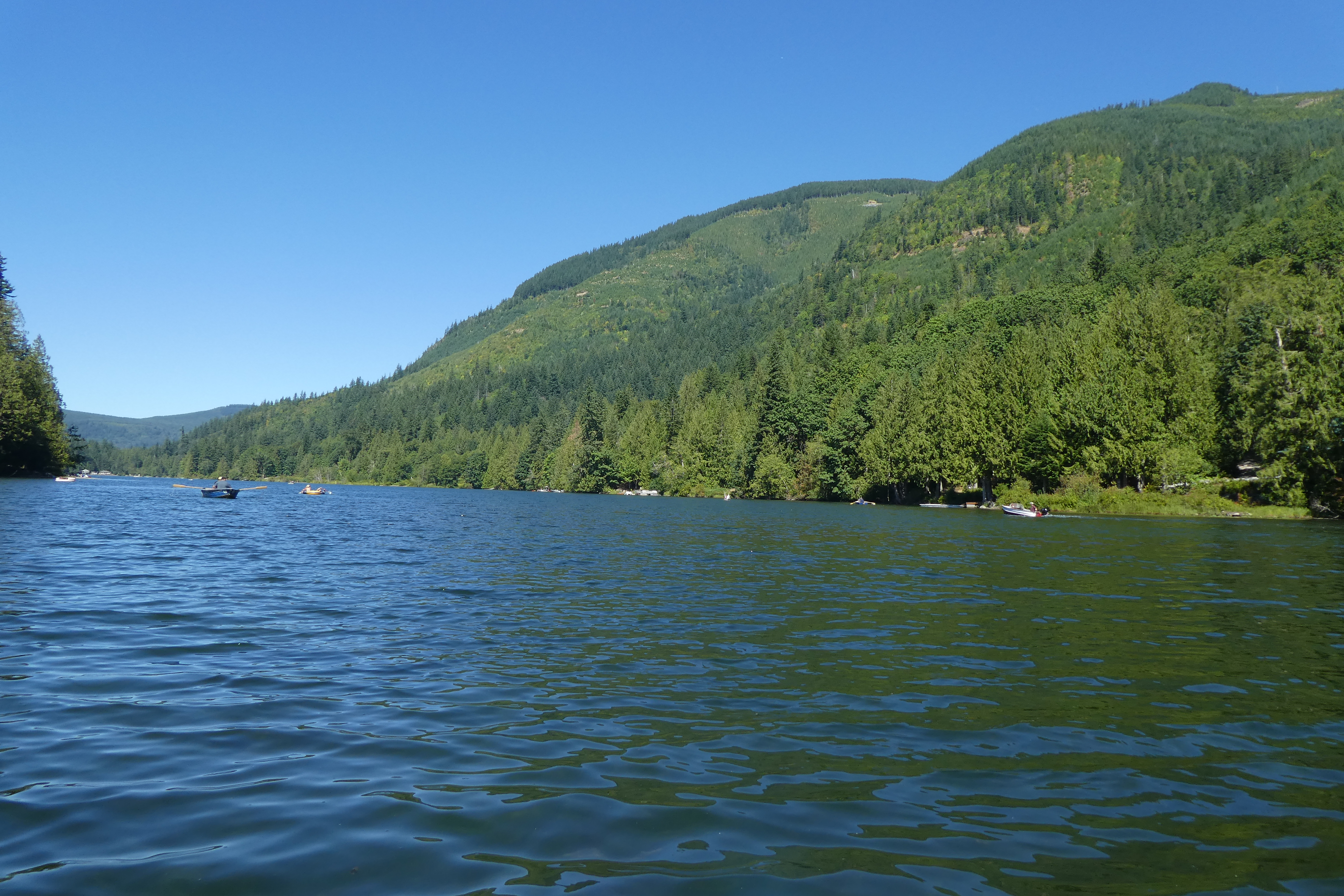
- Silver Lake, 2017
- Interactive map of Silver Lake
- Location: Maple Falls, Whatcom County, Washington
- Coordinates: 48°58′42.44″N 122°4′11.47″W
- Type: Lake
- Primary outflows: Maple Creek, into the North Fork Nooksack
- Surface area: 172.8 acres (69.9 ha)
- Surface elevation: 764 ft (233 m)

Silver Lake (or Fish Lake) is a lake in Whatcom County, Washington. It is north of Maple Falls, between Red Mountain and Black Mountain. The lake drains via Maple Creek into the North Fork Nooksack River.

== Recreation ==
The lake is stocked by the Washington Department of Fish and Wildlife. Fishing is open from April to October. Rainbow Trout and Resident Coastal Cutthroat Trout are present in the lake.

Small recreational boats are allowed on the lake, although there is a 10 horsepower motor restriction in place. There are several boat launches for public use, as well as rental boats, including rowboats, canoes, kayaks, pedal boats, and standup paddleboards.

=== Silver Lake Park ===
Silver Lake Park, made up of 410 acres (170 ha) of land around the southwest side of the lake, has many recreational facilities. The park has 5.75 miles (9.25 km) of trails, one of which allows horses, two RV campgrounds, one tent campground (with one cabin), a group campground, six cabins with views of the lake, a 3 bedroom lodge, five picnic shelters, and a day lodge.
