= Silver Lake (Sumter County, Florida) =

Lake in the state of Florida, United States

- Location within Florida Location within the United States
- Location: along the Hernando County, Florida and Sumter County, Florida border
- Coordinates: 28°34′29″N 82°12′48″W
- Lake type: natural freshwater lake
- Basin countries: United States
- Max. length: 4,250 ft (1,300 m)
- Max. width: 1,170 ft (360 m)
- Surface area: 95.16 acres (39 ha)
- Surface elevation: 43 ft (13 m)
- Islands: 1

Silver Lake is a long and narrow natural freshwater lake on the border between Hernando County, Florida, and Sumter County, Florida. This lake is surrounded by the Withlacoochee State Forest. On the south shore are the Silver Lake Campgrounds. A public boat ramp on the lake shore is within the campgrounds. On the northwest this lake is bounded by Interstate 75. The entire shore of Silver Lake is forested. A small almost round islet, 60 feet (18 m) long by 50 feet (15 m) wide, is in the southeast corner of the lake, just offshore. Sometimes sandbars are nearby. The Withlacoochee River flows into the lake and out the other end.

While this lake has a public boat ramp it has no public swimming beach. There is no information about the types of fish in this lake in online sites.
