= Silbersee (Carinthia) =

Lake in Carinthia, Austria

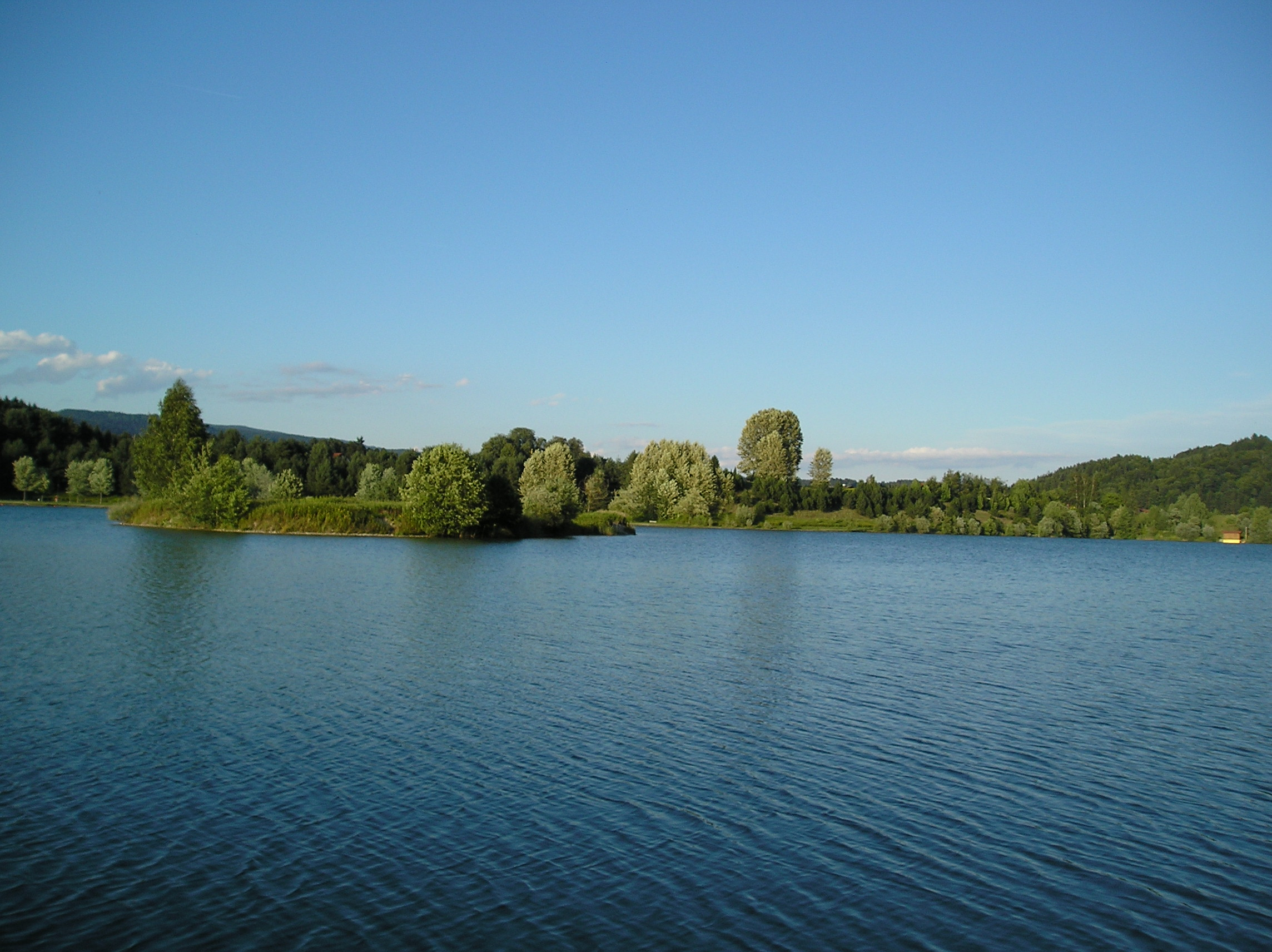

- Location within Kärnten
- Location: Carinthia
- Coordinates: 46°36′33″N 13°54′23″E
- Basin countries: Austria
- Surface area: 8.4 ha (21 acres)
- Max. depth: 7 m (23 ft)
- Surface elevation: 492 m (1,614 ft)
- Settlements: Sankt Ulrich

Silbersee is a small lake in the Austrian state of Carinthia, near the village of Sankt Ulrich, east of the Villach city centre, close to the Drava River. Its surface area is over eight hectares and its maximum depth is seven metres.

The artificial lake arose in the early 1970s during the construction of the nearby Süd Autobahn. Owned by the Villach city administration, it is part of a publicly accessible recreation area and a destination for bathers in summer and ice-skaters in winter. In 1991 it held the Water Ski World Championships.
