= Silver Lake, Florida =

- Census-designated place
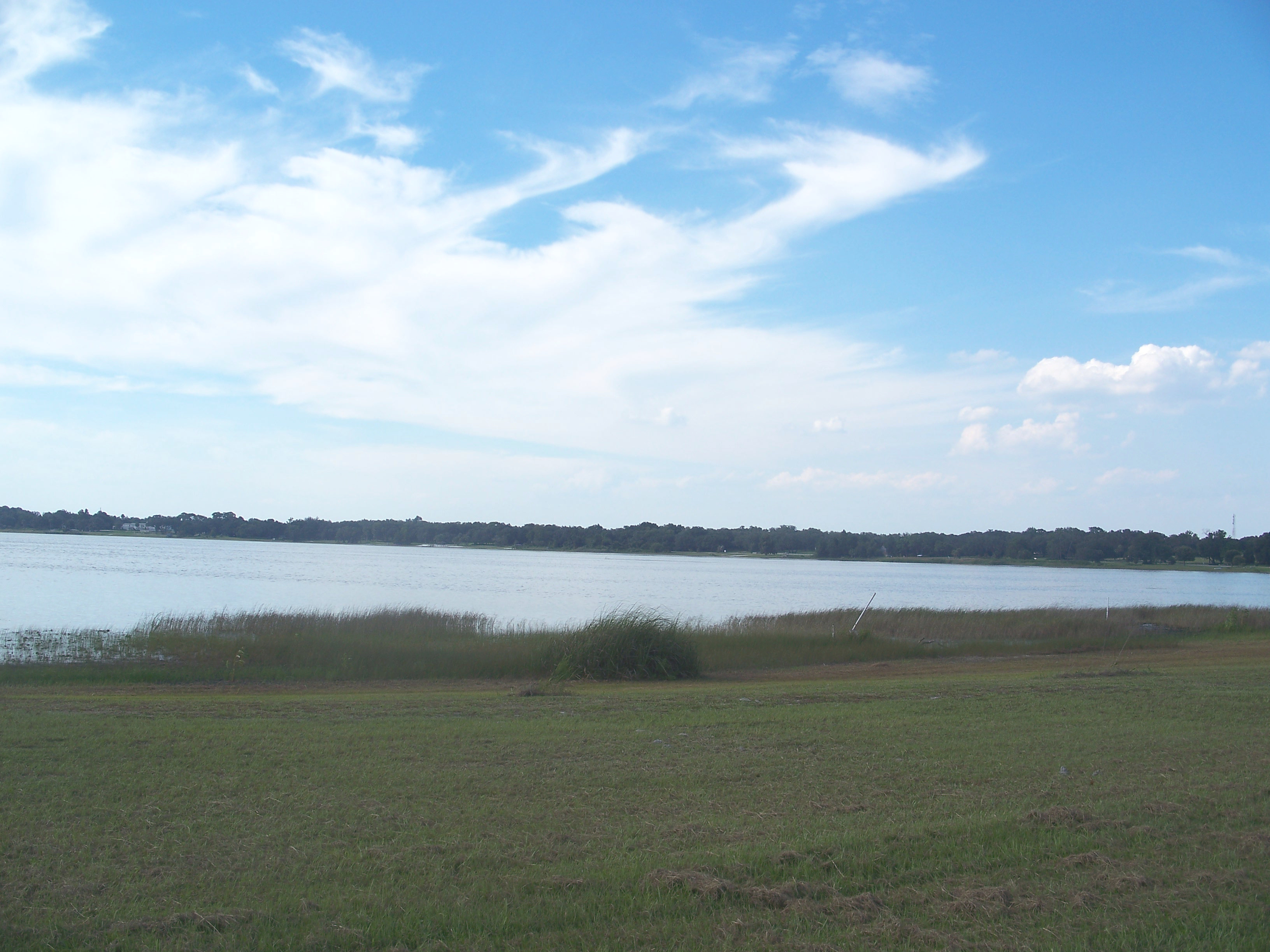
- Silver Lake, behind the Lake–Sumter State College campus

- Location in Lake County and the state of Florida
- Coordinates: 28°50′32″N 81°48′03″W
- Country: United States
- State: Florida
- County: Lake

Area
  - Total: 2.51 sq mi (6.50 km^{2})
  - Land: 1.87 sq mi (4.85 km^{2})
  - Water: 0.64 sq mi (1.65 km^{2})
- Elevation: 66 ft (20 m)

Population (2020)
  - Total: 2,101
  - Density: 1,122/sq mi (433.2/km^{2})
- Time zone: UTC-5 (Eastern (EST))
  - Summer (DST): UTC-4 (EDT)
- ZIP code: 34788
- Area code: 352
- FIPS code: 12-66062
- GNIS feature ID: 2402854

Silver Lake is a census-designated place (CDP) in Lake County, Florida, United States. As of the 2020 census, Silver Lake had a population of 2,101. It is part of the Orlando–Kissimmee Metropolitan Statistical Area.

== Geography ==
Silver Lake is located in central Lake County and is bordered to the south by the city of Leesburg. U.S. Route 441 runs just south of Silver Lake, leading west 5 miles (8 km) to the center of Leesburg and east the same distance to Tavares, the Lake county seat.

According to the United States Census Bureau, the Silver Lake CDP has a total area of 2.8 square miles (7.2 km^{2}), of which 2.1 square miles (5.4 km^{2}) are land and 0.69 square miles (1.8 km^{2}), or 24.50%, are water. Silver Lake, a lake with the same name as the city, is entirely within the CDP.

== Demographics ==
Historical population
Census	Pop.	Note	%±
2020	2,101		—
U.S. Decennial Census

=== 2020 census ===
As of the 2020 census, Silver Lake had a population of 2,101. The median age was 49.6 years. 17.7% of residents were under the age of 18 and 25.9% of residents were 65 years of age or older. For every 100 females there were 98.0 males, and for every 100 females age 18 and over there were 94.3 males age 18 and over.

85.4% of residents lived in urban areas, while 14.6% lived in rural areas.

There were 879 households in Silver Lake, of which 20.1% had children under the age of 18 living in them. Of all households, 54.2% were married-couple households, 17.3% were households with a male householder and no spouse or partner present, and 22.2% were households with a female householder and no spouse or partner present. About 25.6% of all households were made up of individuals and 12.2% had someone living alone who was 65 years of age or older.

There were 926 housing units, of which 5.1% were vacant. The homeowner vacancy rate was 0.0% and the rental vacancy rate was 6.6%.

Racial composition as of the 2020 census
Race	Number	Percent
White	1,674	79.7%
Black or African American	205	9.8%
American Indian and Alaska Native	8	0.4%
Asian	43	2.0%
Native Hawaiian and Other Pacific Islander	0	0.0%
Some other race	35	1.7%
Two or more races	136	6.5%
Hispanic or Latino (of any race)	165	7.9%

=== 2000 census ===
As of the census of 2000, there were 1,882 people, 810 households, and 563 families residing in the CDP. The population density was 768.5 inhabitants per square mile (296.7/km^{2}). There were 872 housing units at an average density of 356.1 per square mile (137.5/km^{2}). The racial makeup of the CDP was 90.91% White, 3.88% African American, 0.11% Native American, 3.40% Asian, 0.05% Pacific Islander, 0.64% from other races, and 1.01% from two or more races. Hispanic or Latino of any race were 2.23% of the population.

There were 810 households, 24.7% of which had children under the age of 18 living with them, 63.0% were married couples living together, 5.1% had a female householder with no husband present, and 30.4% were non-families. 24.6% of all households were made up of individuals, and 8.5% had someone living alone who was 65 years of age or older. The average household size was 2.32 and the average family size was 2.77.

In the CDP, the population was spread out, with 20.5% under the age of 18, 5.6% from 18 to 24, 23.2% from 25 to 44, 28.7% from 45 to 64, and 22.0% who were 65 years of age or older. The median age was 46 years. For every 100 females, there were 93.8 males. For every 100 females age 18 and over, there were 94.2 males.

The median income for a household in the CDP was $55,347, and the median income for a family was $73,750. Males had a median income of $44,053 versus $30,750 for females. The per capita income for the CDP was $27,258. About 6.5% of families and 8.8% of the population were below the poverty line, including 14.5% of those under age 18 and 6.3% of those age 65 or above.
