= Silver Lake Township =

Silver Lake Township may refer to:

- Silver Lake Township, Desha County, Arkansas
- Silver Lake Township, Dickinson County, Iowa
- Silver Lake Township, Palo Alto County, Iowa
- Silver Lake Township, Worth County, Iowa
- Silver Lake Township, Shawnee County, Kansas, in Shawnee County, Kansas
- Silver Lake Township, Martin County, Minnesota
- Silver Lake Township, Adams County, Nebraska
- Silver Lake Township, Wells County, North Dakota
- Silver Lake Township, Pennsylvania
- Silver Lake Township, Hutchinson County, South Dakota

== See also ==
- Silver Lake (disambiguation)
