= Silver Lake (Pittsfield, Massachusetts) =

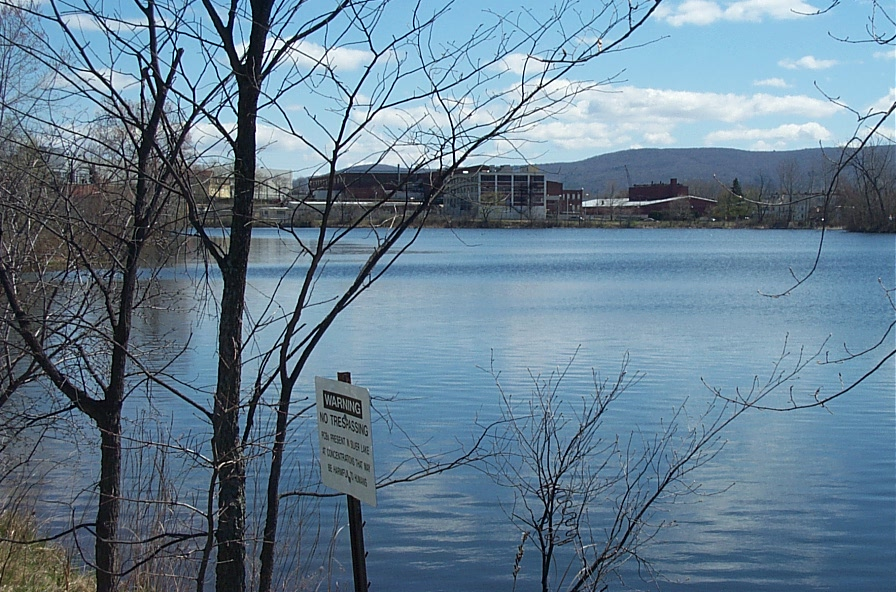
- Silver Lake with a warning sign (Pre-Cleanup)

- Location within Massachusetts Location within the United States
- Location: Pittsfield, Massachusetts
- Coordinates: 42°27′03″N 73°14′25″W
- Type: lake
- Basin countries: United States
- Surface area: 26 acres (11 ha)
- Max. depth: 30 ft (9.1 m)
- Surface elevation: 974 ft (297 m)

Silver Lake is a lake in Pittsfield, Massachusetts. The lake has had environmental concerns and been subject to a clean-up effort by both the city of Pittsfield and the Environmental Protection Agency (EPA).

== Location ==
Silver Lake is bounded to north by Silver Lake Boulevard and Fourth Street, and the west and south by residential and commercial properties. It is approximately 26 acres (11 ha) large with a maximum water depth of about 30 feet (9.1 m).

== Environmental ==
The lake currently receives storm water flow from several City outfalls and one NPDES-permitted outfall. The NPDES-permitted outfall receives storm water from a portion of the GE Plant Area that has been transferred to PEDA. Silver Lake drains to the Housatonic River by an underground 48-inch (120 cm) diameter, concrete, culvert pipe located near the intersection of Fenn Street and East Street. Two significant oil spills have occurred in the lake, and garbage, sewage and PCBs have been dumped into it. The lake caught fire in 1923 due to the pollution.

=== Cleanup ===
The long-polluted lake has undergone a massive cleanup (July 2012 – December 2013) and has opened as a park to the public with water safe enough for activities like fishing and boating. Recently re-mediated Silver Lake is a recreational asset to the city, according to local officials, fit for picnics, boating and fishing. GE submits annual reports regarding the details of all of the inspection, monitoring and maintenance activities that occurred within the Silver Lake Area Removal Action Area over the course of a given year.
