= Silver Lake (Silver Lake, Florida) =

Lake in the state of Florida, United States

- Location within Florida Location within the United States
- Location: Silver Lake, Florida
- Coordinates: 28°50′18″N 81°48′14″W
- Lake type: natural freshwater lake
- Basin countries: United States
- Max. length: 4,855 ft (1,480 m)
- Max. width: 4,215 ft (1,285 m)
- Surface area: 379 acres (153 ha)
- Max. depth: 22 ft (7 m)
- Surface elevation: 66 ft (20 m)

Silver Lake is an almost circular, natural freshwater lake in Lake County, Florida. Silver Lake Drive surrounds the lake. Much of it is surrounded by residences and private boat and fishing docks, which dot the lake. The northeast side used to be the home of the Silver Lake Country Club, on the southeast is the Lake-Sumter State College campus and a flight line of Leesburg International Airport. Also, inside the end of the flight line is the Leesburg Dog Park. All of the lake is inside the city of Silver Lake, Florida.

There is no public boat ramp or swimming beach. According to the Hook and Bullet website, this lake contains panfish and bass (fish). However, since there is no public access to the shore, permission from landowners must be obtained prior to fishing here.
