= Silver Lake (Bovina, New York) =

- Location of Silver Lake within New York
- Location: Delaware County, New York
- Coordinates: 42°14′15″N 74°47′27″W
- Type: Reservoir
- Basin countries: United States
- Surface area: 15 acres (6.1 ha)
- Surface elevation: 1,808 ft (551 m)
- Settlements: Bovina Center

Silver Lake is a small reservoir located south of the hamlet of Bovina Center in Delaware County, New York. Silver Lake drains northwest via an unnamed creek which flows into the Little Delaware River.

== See also ==
- List of lakes in New York
