= Silver Lake Joint School District 1 =

School district in Wisconsin, United States

Silver Lake Joint School District 1 is an independent school district which serves Silver Lake, Wisconsin, and a small portion of the Salem, Wisconsin community. Riverview Elementary School is the only educational facility which serves the district.

== Riverview Elementary School ==
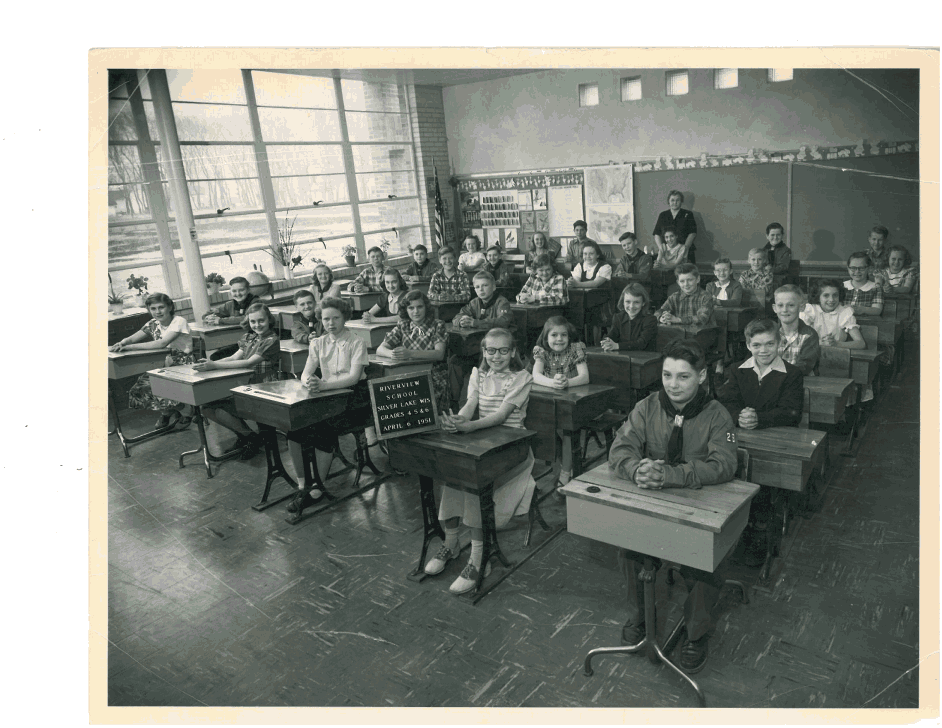
Riverview School's 4th, 5th, and 6th grade classes, April 1951

Riverview Elementary School was established in the village of Silver Lake, Wisconsin, in 1895. It was built on land donated by William A. Schenning.

Riverview Elementary School has changed a lot from when it was first built. It used to be on the west side of the Soo Line Railroad, but now rests on a nine-acre parcel of land adjacent to the east side of the railway. The original footprint of this school in this new location originally only had four rooms: 1–2, 3–4, 5–6, and 7–8. Kindergarten was added later. The principal also taught grades 7–8. Some children had to go home for lunch because they were near the school, while others who did not stayed in their classrooms and ate lunch. There was no gymnasium, but recess was a good time for physical education.

The original Riverview School was built in 1895 and was only one room. The sole teacher’s name was Gertrude L. Bothe. In 1912 the school established a second room. A proposal to build a new school on a new parcel of land was made at a meeting on July 11, 1949. The construction plan, approved on August 8, 1949, was to build a three-room school on a nine-acre area. The plans were again modified to include the addition of two bathrooms, an office, and a fifth grade classroom. Mr. Lawrence was the designer.

In 1952, a basement and kitchen were added. Enid Frank was the principal at this time. The staff consisted of only three other people.

In 1955, two more classrooms, a storage room, washrooms for the Kindergarten, and an extra door to create a double-door entry were all added. Then, in 1969, Mr. Hellum became the administrator. With this change came the construction of four more classrooms, a teachers’ lounge, a music room, material center, and AV room. Those rooms were the new junior high. In 1974, two rooms and a hall were added for sixth grade classrooms at a cost of $75,000.

In 1976, the school had 433 students and a staff of 29 teachers. In 1976, Mr. Feld became assistant principal. In 1978, four classrooms were added for the fifth grade which cost $275,000. A 1998 addition to the school included the construction of a full-sized gymnasium, stage, music room, band room, art room, library, storage, and an upgraded furnace, at a cost of $3,900,000. In 1998, Dr. Hellum retired and Gary Petersen was hired as administrator.

== Activities and programs ==
=== Multicultural Night ===
Multicultural Night, one of Riverview School's most crowd-pleasing events, has an estimated 500–750 attendees every year. For the 2014 event, its third year, students made displays for thirteen different cultures. The topics included Animals around the World (4K), the United States (Kindergarten), Australia (1st grade), China (2nd grade), Family Heritage (3rd grade), Africa (4th grade), West Indies (5th grade), Ancient Civilizations (6th grade), Latin America (7th grade), and Japan, the Koreas, the Philippines, Vietnam, and Cambodia (8th grade). The gifted and talented students also created displays for South Sudan, Nepal, and India, based on books that they had read.

Multicultural Night started in 2010 as a part of the Turn Off the Screen Week. Riverview decided to make this a bigger event, so it was renamed to the First Annual Multicultural Fair in 2011. The night was started to raise cultural awareness within the school and community.

=== Pet Club ===
Critter Club Fundraising Team.

Critter Club is a group of fifth and sixth graders who teach peers how to take responsibility for small animals such as guinea pigs and hamsters. A testing program is used to hold the animals. There are varied opinions on these tests. Some people think it is a great way to show what you know and what you need to work on. Some people dislike the tests. This test is a simple form made on Google Drive and consists of about 20 questions. If you get 95%-100% you pass and get an animal license. This license gives you permission to hold and play with pets. This club’s goal is to interact with other animal lovers and teaches great responsibilities. The club also does fundraisers for the class pets with Looms4❤, by making rubber band jewelry and selling it at school events. Members of the club learn how to budget money, fundraise, clean cages, and handle animals correctly.

=== Fabulous Five ===
Two teachers created Fabulous Five. Fab 5 was started so that big kids and little kids could work together in different ways by using their intelligence. Events include the American Idol contest, Math 24 competition, Scrabble competition, 3-on-3 Basketball tournament, and Pictionary contest. Fab 5 has been around for about 6 years. Every year about 122 students participate. All the money goes to the Drama program to help purchase costumes, microphones, and props. Fab 5 2013 Article Fab 5 Recap

=== TOPS Behavioral Program ===
TOPS (Totally Outstanding Positive Students) is a school behavior plan for students to get rewards for magnificent behavior. The program creates common expectations for all kids at Riverview School. TOPS was created by Andrea Zackary (principal), John Gendron (district administrator), and a group of teachers.

The challenge for TOPS is getting the 7th-8th graders (junior high) to understand that it is not just for the younger students. There have been numerous changes since TOPS began in the 2012-13 school year. TOPS is also a guide for students to behave in a positive manner. Incentives offer rewards for TOPS behavior. TOPS is an expectation for students where that could do good, then receive good. The popularity of TOPS continues to develop every year. TOPS Website

=== Pentathlon ===
Riverview School hosts an Academic Pentathlon team, consisting only of junior high students. During its inaugural year, the school's team took first in the Wisconsin Academic Pentathlon competition in 2014. This same team won third place in the national competition later that year.
