= Silver Lake District =

Historic district in New Hampshire, United States

- U.S. National Register of Historic Places
- U.S. Historic district
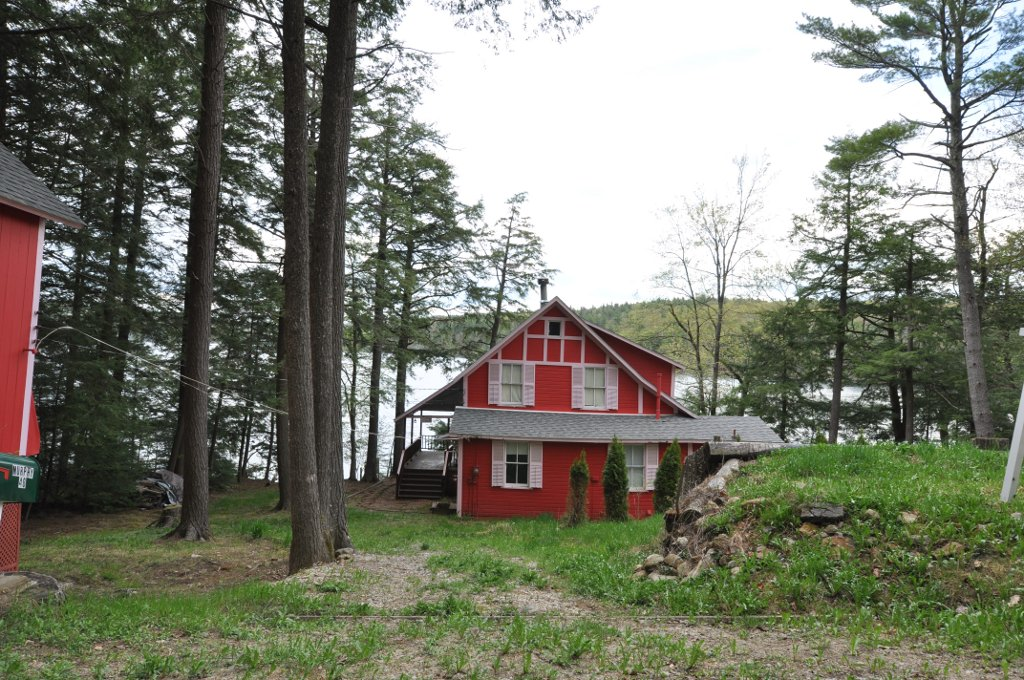

- Location within New Hampshire Location within the United States
- Location: Roughly along Old Nelson, Eastside, and Westside Rds., Harrisville, New Hampshire
- Area: 66 acres (27 ha)
- Built by: Law, Alexander; Et al.
- Architectural style: Gothic, Stick style/Eastlake movement, Queen Anne
- MPS: Harrisville MRA
- NRHP reference No.: 86003100
- Added to NRHP: December 29, 1986

The Silver Lake District is a historic district encompassing a summer resort area along the southern section of Silver Lake in Harrisville, New Hampshire. It includes a collection of summer cottages built along or near the shores of the lake between about 1880 and 1903, a period of prosperity in Harrisville and nearby Keene. It is unusual in that most of the owners and occupants of its properties were from nearby towns, and not from further afield, as the populations of the summer colonies of Nelson and Dublin were. The district covers 66 acres (27 ha) from the town line between Harrisville and Nelson to the southern end of the lake, and includes 76 contributing buildings. It was listed on the National Register of Historic Places in 1986.

The Silver Lake area was first settled in the mid-18th century, and was predominantly agricultural in use until the arrival of the railroad at Chesham in 1880. Around 1886 Corban Farwell and Wellington Seaver, the major landowners around the southern end of the lake, began selling off lakefront lots, on which vacationers built modest cottages. Of the 37 cottages built before 1903, 35 are still standing. The architecture of most of them is best described as vernacular and Stick style, with siding that is either vertical planking, board-and-batten, or tongue-and-groove. Some houses have bands of decorative cut shingles, and most houses feature porches that wrap around at least two sides, and offer views of the lake or the mountains. Some houses have Gothic-style vergeboard decoration and trim elements.

Most of the properties in the district are located on the lake side of East Side Road and West Side Road, dead-end roads which run near the shores of the lake from its southern end. Some houses, which were built on some the first lots to be sold off by Corban Farwell, are located on Old Nelson Road. The original lots for these properties originally ran to the lake, but were subdivided, separating them from the lake.

== See also ==
- National Register of Historic Places listings in Cheshire County, New Hampshire
