= Silver Lake (Harrisville, New Hampshire) =

Lake in New Hampshire, United States

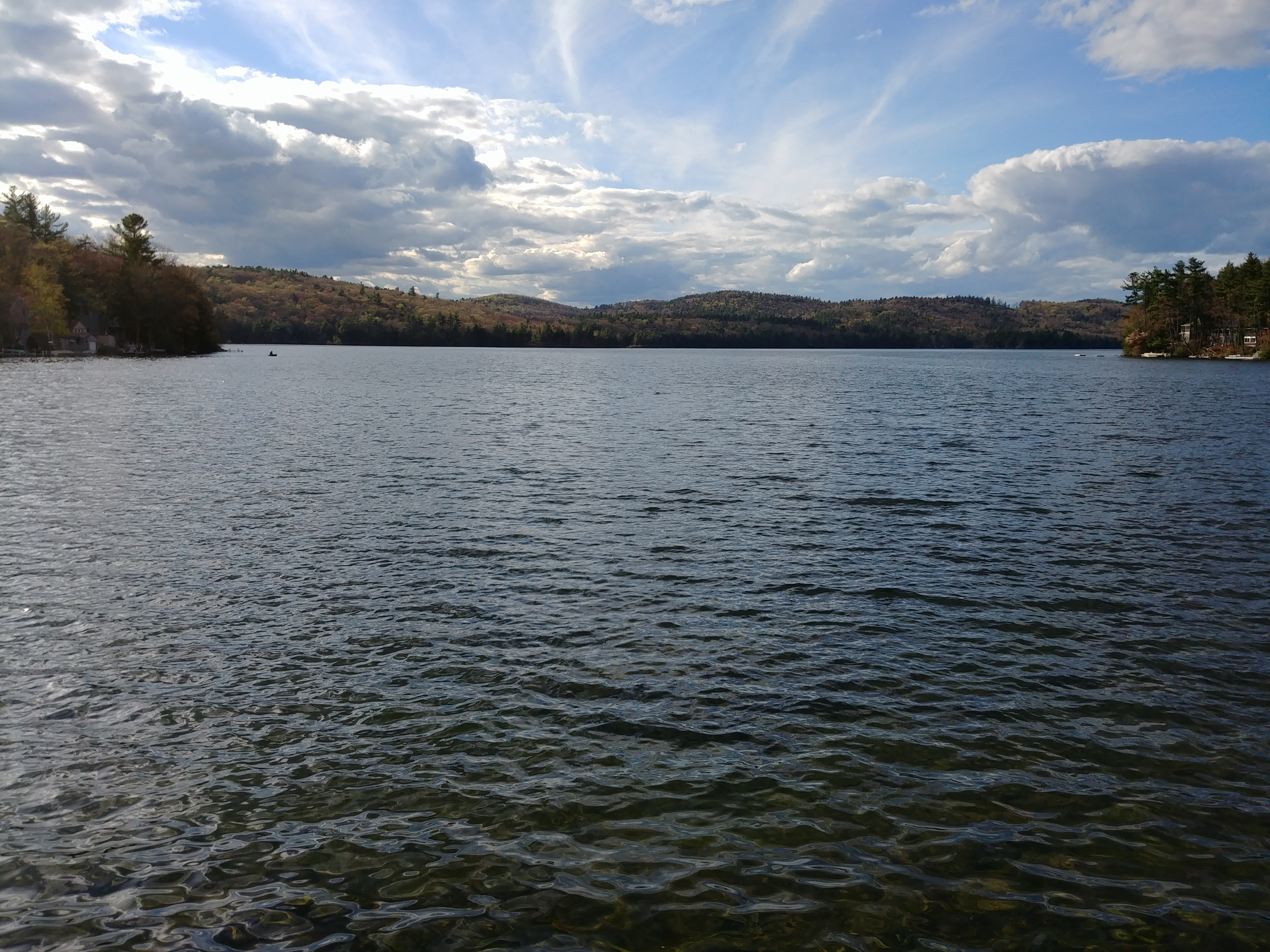
- The lake seen from the dam area

- Location within New Hampshire Location within the United States
- Location: Cheshire County, New Hampshire
- Coordinates: 42°57′37″N 72°8′33″W
- Primary outflows: Tributary of Minnewawa Brook
- Basin countries: United States
- Max. length: 1.8 mi (2.9 km)
- Max. width: 0.6 mi (0.97 km)
- Surface area: 346 acres (1.40 km^{2})
- Average depth: 40 ft (12 m)
- Max. depth: 95 ft (29 m)
- Surface elevation: 1,319 ft (402 m)
- Islands: 4
- Settlements: Harrisville; Nelson

Silver Lake is a 346-acre (1.40 km^{2}) water body located in Cheshire County in southwestern New Hampshire, United States, in the towns of Harrisville and Nelson. Water from Silver Lake flows via Minnewawa Brook and The Branch to the Ashuelot River, a tributary of the Connecticut River.

The Silver Lake District, located along the southern portion of the lake, is a historic district listed in the National Register of Historic Places.

The lake is classified as a coldwater fishery, with observed species including rainbow trout, lake trout, smallmouth and largemouth bass, and horned pout. Many small islands on the south and west side of the lake are NH Loon Preserve registered habitats.

In 2018, the largest remaining undeveloped parcel on Silver Lake was permanently protected via a conservation easement with the Harris Center for Conservation Education. The center worked closely with the Silver Lake Land Trust and the Seaver Silver Lake Farm Trust for more than a year on the project. The easement includes 50 acres (20 ha) of land and nearly 800 feet (240 m) of shoreline on the southern end of the lake in Harrisville, and it adds to a block of more than 6,000 acres (2,400 ha) of contiguous conservation land in the towns of Nelson, Roxbury, Harrisville, and Marlborough. With the completion of the project, 80% of the Silver Lake watershed, including 2.9 miles (4.7 km) of shoreline, are protected.

== See also ==
- List of lakes in New Hampshire
