= List of 1988 films based on actual events =

This is a list of films and miniseries released in 1988 that are based on actual events. All films on this list are from American production unless indicated otherwise.

== 1988 ==
- A Dangerous Life (1988) – Australian crime drama film about the journey and the love affair of an American foreign correspondent set during the final years of Ferdinand Marcos' dictatorship in the Philippines, from the assassination of Benigno Aquino Jr. in 1983 to the People Power Revolution in 1986, as well as other key events that led to the ouster of Marcos
- A Man for All Seasons (1988) – biographical drama television film based on the life of Sir Thomas More
- A Stoning in Fulham County (1988) – crime drama television film based on the true story of the murder of an Amish baby by a group of reckless teens in Indiana in 1979
- A World Apart (1988) – drama film based on the lives of Shawn Slovo's parents, Ruth First and Joe Slovo
- The Accused (1988) – legal drama film loosely based on the 1983 gang rape of Cheryl Araujo in New Bedford, Massachusetts
- Alega Gang: Public Enemy No.1 of Cebu (1988) – Filipino action crime film depicting an account of the life of Ulysses "Boboy" Alega, and his descent into crime
- And the Violins Stopped Playing (Polish: I Skrzypce Przestały Grać) (1988) – American-Polish historical drama film about an actual group of Romani people who were forced to flee from persecution by the Nazi regime at the height of the Porajmos, during World War II
- Appointment in Liverpool (Italian: Appuntamento a Liverpool) (1988) – Italian drama film loosely based on the Heysel Stadium disaster
- Apprentice to Murder (1988) – mystery thriller film loosely based on the true story of the 1928 Nelson Rehmeyer "Hex Hollow" murder case in York, Pennsylvania
- The Attic: The Hiding of Anne Frank (1988) – historical war drama television film about Miep Gies' experience keeping Anne Frank and her family hidden and safe inside the secret annex, as the Nazis turn Amsterdam upside-down
- Aviya's Summer (Hebrew: הקיץ של אביה ) (1988) – Israeli biographical drama film based on Gila Almagor's childhood
- Bat*21 (1988) – war drama film dramatizing the rescue of a U.S. air navigator shot down behind enemy lines in Vietnam during the Vietnam War
- Biloxi Blues (1988) – comedy war drama film based on the 1984 play of the same title
- Bird (1988) – biographical musical drama film about jazz saxophonist Charlie "Bird" Parker
- Bloodsport (1988) – martial arts sport action film centring on Frank Dux, a United States Army Captain and ninjutsu practitioner, who competes in an underground full-contact martial arts tournament called the Kumite in Hong Kong
- Bloody Wednesday (1988) – crime thriller film based on the events of the San Ysidro McDonald's massacre
- Buster (1988) – British romantic crime drama film based on events from the Great Train Robbery
- But I'm Still the King (Spanish: Pero sigo siendo el rey) (1988) – Mexican musical drama film portraying the life of Mexican singer-songwriter José Alfredo Jiménez
- Camille Claudel (1988) – French biographical drama film about the life of 19th-century sculptor Camille Claudel
- Camp de Thiaroye (1988) – Senegalese war drama film documenting the events leading up to the Thiaroye massacre, as well as the massacre itself
- Christabel (1988) – British biographical drama miniseries based on the memoirs of Christabel Bielenberg, an English woman married to a German lawyer during World War II
- Dadah Is Death (1988) – Australian drama television film based on the Barlow and Chambers execution in Malaysia in 1986
- David (1988) – biographical drama television film dramatizing the true story of a child named David Rothenberg who was burned by his father
- Dead Ringers (1988) – psychological thriller film based on the lives of Stewart and Cyril Marcus, identical twin gynaecologists who practiced together in New York City
- The Deceivers (1988) – American-British-Indian adventure crime drama film about the Thuggee movement in India during the period of British rule during the 19th-century
- Diary of King Yeonsan (Korean: 연산일기) (1988) – South Korean historical drama film based on the life of Yeonsangun of Joseon, who was the subject of director Shin Sang-ok's award-winning Prince Yeonsan (1961)
- Don Bosco (1988) – Italian biographical drama film depicting real life events of Roman Catholic priest John Bosco
- Eight Men Out (1988) – sport drama film dramatizing the Major League Baseball's Black Sox Scandal, in which eight members of the Chicago White Sox conspired with gamblers to intentionally lose the 1919 World Series
- El Lute II: Tomorrow I'll be Free (Spanish: El Lute II: mañana seré libre) (1988) – Spanish biographical drama film based on the memoirs of Eleuterio Sánchez, "El Lute", a delinquent who became notorious in Spain for his jail escapes in the 60's
- The Everlasting Secret Family (1988) – Australian romantic drama film about a secret society of gay men, based on the life of a prominent Australian Politician
- Evil Angels (1988) – Australian biographical drama film chronicling the case of Azaria Chamberlain, a nine-week-old baby girl who disappeared from a campground near Uluru in August 1980, and the struggle of her parents, Michael Chamberlain and Lindy Chamberlain, to prove their innocence to a public convinced that they were complicit in her death
- Fallada: The Last Chapter (German: Fallada – letztes Kapitel) (1988) – East German biographical drama film about the life of Hans Fallada
- The Four Minute Mile (1988) – Australian-British biographical drama miniseries about the race to run the four-minute mile, focusing on the rivalry between Roger Bannister and John Landy
- Fragments of War: The Story of Damien Parer (1988) – Australian biographical drama television film about the war photographer Damien Parer
- Gorillas in the Mist (1988) – biographical drama film about Dian Fossey, a scientist who came to Africa to study the vanishing mountain gorillas, and later fought to protect them
- Grave of the Fireflies (Japanese: 火垂るの墓) (1988) – Japanese animated war drama film based on Akiyuki Nosaka's experiences before, during, and after the firebombing of Kobe in 1945
- The Great Escape II: The Untold Story (1988) – action adventure drama television film telling the story of a special task force sent to hunt down the culprits responsible for carrying out the orders to murder 50 of the 76 escapees from Stalag Luft III
- Hanna's War (1988) – biographical war film detailing the true story of Hannah Szenes
- Haunted Summer (1988) – biographical romantic drama film depicting a fictionalization of the summer of 1816 in which authors Lord Byron, Percy Shelley, and Mary Shelley, together with Lord Byron's ex-lover and his doctor, John William Polidori, spent in the isolated Villa Diodati by Lake Geneva
- In the Line of Duty: The F.B.I. Murders (1988) – action crime drama television film about the 1986 FBI Miami shootout that occurred on 11 April 1986
- Inherit the Wind (1988) – historical legal drama television film fictionalizing the 1925 Scopes "Monkey" Trial as a means of discussing the 1950s McCarthy trials
- Jack the Ripper (1988) – British-American crime drama miniseries based on the notorious Jack the Ripper murder spree in Victorian London
- Jesse (1988) – drama television film about a nurse in a small town that has no doctor who is arrested for practicing medicine without a licence, based on the true story of Patricia Coda, a Death Valley, California, nurse
- Judgment in Berlin (1988) – drama film based on the Cold War true story of three East Berlin men who hijack a plane to escape to the West
- The King Chronicle (1988) – Canadian biographical drama miniseries depicting the life and career of the eccentric and enduring Prime Minister of Canada, William Lyon Mackenzie King
- Kumander Dante (1988) – Filipino biographical action film about the co-founder of the New People's Army, the militant arm of the Communist Party of the Philippines, Bernabe "Kumander Dante" Buscayno
- Liberace: Behind the Music (1988) – Canadian-American biographical drama television film based on the life and death of Władziu Valentino Liberace, who went from a humble working-class background to become a famous American pianist and vocalist
- Lincoln (1988) – historical drama miniseries covering the period from Lincoln's election as President of the United States to the time of his assassination
- Lorenzo Ruiz: The Saint... A Filipino (1988) – Filipino biographical drama film about the life and martyrdom of Saint Lorenzo Ruiz, the first canonized saint of the Philippines
- The Loves of Kafka (Spanish: Los Amores de Kafka) (1988) – Argentine biographical romantic drama film about Franz Kafka and Milena Jesenská
- Malarek (1988) – Canadian action drama film centring on Victor Malarek, as a newly hired junior reporter in Montreal, Quebec, investigating unsafe and inhumane conditions in the province's juvenile detention system, interspersed with flashbacks to Malarek's own troubled youth when he spent some time in the very same system
- Melba (1988) – Australian biographical drama miniseries about opera soprano Nellie Melba
- Men Behind the Sun (Mandarin: 黑太陽731) (1988) – Hong Kong historical horror film depicting the war atrocities committed by the Imperial Japanese Army at Unit 731, the secret biological weapons experimentation unit of the Imperial Japanese Army during the Second Sino-Japanese War
- Mississippi Burning (1988) – crime thriller film loosely based on the 1964 murder investigation of Chaney, Goodman, and Schwerner in Mississippi
- Moonzund (Russian: Моонзунд) (1988) – Soviet war drama film based on the Battle of Moon Sound which took place during World War I
- The Murder of Mary Phagan (1988) – historical crime drama miniseries dramatizing the true story of Leo Frank, a factory manager who was convicted of the murder a 13-year-old girl, a factory worker named Mary Phagan, in Atlanta in 1913
- Murder One (1988) – biographical crime drama film based on the 1973 Alday family murders
- Onassis: The Richest Man in the World (1988) – American-Spanish biographical drama television film based on the life of Aristotle Onassis, a Greek who rose to become one of the world's wealthiest men, detailing his rise to power and unhappy marriages
- One Way Ticket (Spanish: Un pasaje de Ida) (1988) – Dominican drama film retelling of the Regina Express tragedy, in which 22 Dominican stowaways died from suffocation in an attempt of illegal travel in September 1981
- Painted Faces (Cantonese: 七小福) (1988) – Hong Kong biographical drama film focusing on Master Yu and his methods on bringing up his protégés
- Pancho Barnes (1988) – biographical drama television film about the pioneering female aviator, Florence Lowe "Pancho" Barnes
- Patty Hearst (1988) – biographical crime drama film depicting the kidnapping of student Patty Hearst by the Symbionese Liberation Army, her transformation into an active follower of the SLA after a long-lasting imprisonment and process of purported brainwashing, and her final arrest after a series of armed robberies
- Prisoner of Rio (1988) – biographical drama film depicting the flight of the Great Train Robber Ronnie Biggs to Brazil and the attempts of Scotland Yard detectives to re-capture him
- The Rainbow Warrior conspiracy (1988) – Australian-New Zealander thriller miniseries based on the Sinking of the Rainbow Warrior
- Rowing with the Wind (Spanish: Remando al viento) (1988) – Spanish mystery drama film about the summer of 1816 in which authors Lord Byron, Percy Shelley, and Mary Shelley spent time together
- Running on Empty (1988) – crime drama film about a counterculture couple, loosely modeled after Weather Underground leaders Bill Ayers and Bernardine Dohrn, on the run from the FBI, and how one of their sons starts to break out of this fugitive lifestyle
- The Serpent and the Rainbow (1988) – horror film loosely based on the non-fiction book of the same name by ethnobotanist Wade Davis, wherein Davis recounted his experiences in Haiti investigating the story of Clairvius Narcisse, who was allegedly poisoned, buried alive, and revived with a herbal brew which produced what was called a zombie
- Shattered Innocence (1988) – drama television film about an eighteen year old former Kansas high school cheerleader who moves to L.A. to become a porn actress, and is drugged with cocaine before committing suicide at age twenty, based on real-life accounts of the late Shauna Grant
- Shootdown (1988) – drama television film depicting the story of Korean Air Lines Flight 007 which was shot down by a Soviet Sukhoi Su-15 interceptor
- Stand and Deliver (1988) – biographical drama film based on the true story of a high school mathematics teacher, Jaime Escalante
- Story of Women (French: Une affaire de femmes) (1988) – French historical drama film based on the true story of Marie-Louise Giraud, guillotined on 30 July 1943, for having performed 27 abortions in the Cherbourg area
- Stradivari (1988) – Italian biographical drama film depicting real life events of luthier Antonio Stradivari
- Superstar: The Karen Carpenter Story (1988) – experimental biographical film that portrays the last 17 years of singer Karen Carpenter's life, as she struggled with anorexia
- The Taking of Flight 847: The Uli Derickson Story (1988) – drama television film based on the actual hijacking of TWA Flight 847 as seen through the eyes of flight purser Uli Derickson, the chief flight attendant
- Talk Radio (1988) – drama thriller film partially based on the assassination of Denver radio host Alan Berg in 1984
- Three Seats for the 26th (French: Trois places pour le 26) (1988) – French biographical drama film about the life of Yves Montand
- Tjoet Nja' Dhien (1988) – Indonesian war drama film based on the life's story of female Acehnese guerrilla leader Cut Nyak Dhien, focusing on the six-year period between her second husband, Teuku Umar's death and her capture by the Dutch colonial army
- To Heal a Nation (1988) – drama television film telling the true story of Jan Scruggs, a decorated veteran of the Vietnam War
- Tomorrow (Japanese: 明日) (1988) – Japanese war film about the Atomic bombings of Hiroshima and Nagasaki
- Too Young the Hero (1988) – historical war drama television film telling the true story of a 12-year-old boy (Calvin Graham) who forges his mother's signature to join the United States Navy during World War II
- Tucker: The Man and His Dream (1988) – biographical comedy drama film recounting Preston Tucker's story and his attempt to produce and market the Tucker 48, which was met with scandal between the Big Three automobile manufacturers and accusations of stock fraud from the U.S. Securities and Exchange Commission
- Tumbledown (1988) – British biographical war drama television film centring on the experiences of Robert Lawrence MC, an officer of the Scots Guards during the Falklands War of 1982
- Via Panisperna Boys (Italian: I ragazzi di via Panisperna) (1988) – Italian biographical drama film telling the enthusiasms, fears, joys and disappointments of the (private and professional) life of a well-known group of young men fond of physics and mathematics, who just made history as the Via Panisperna boys
- The Woman He Loved (1988) – British romantic drama television film about the abdication of Edward VIII
- Young Guns (1988) – Western action drama film retelling the adventures of Billy the Kid during the Lincoln County War, which took place in New Mexico in 1877–78
- Young Toscanini (Italian: Il giovane Toscanini) (1988) – Italian-French biographical drama film depicting the early career and romances of the conductor Arturo Toscanini in Rio de Janeiro in 1886
