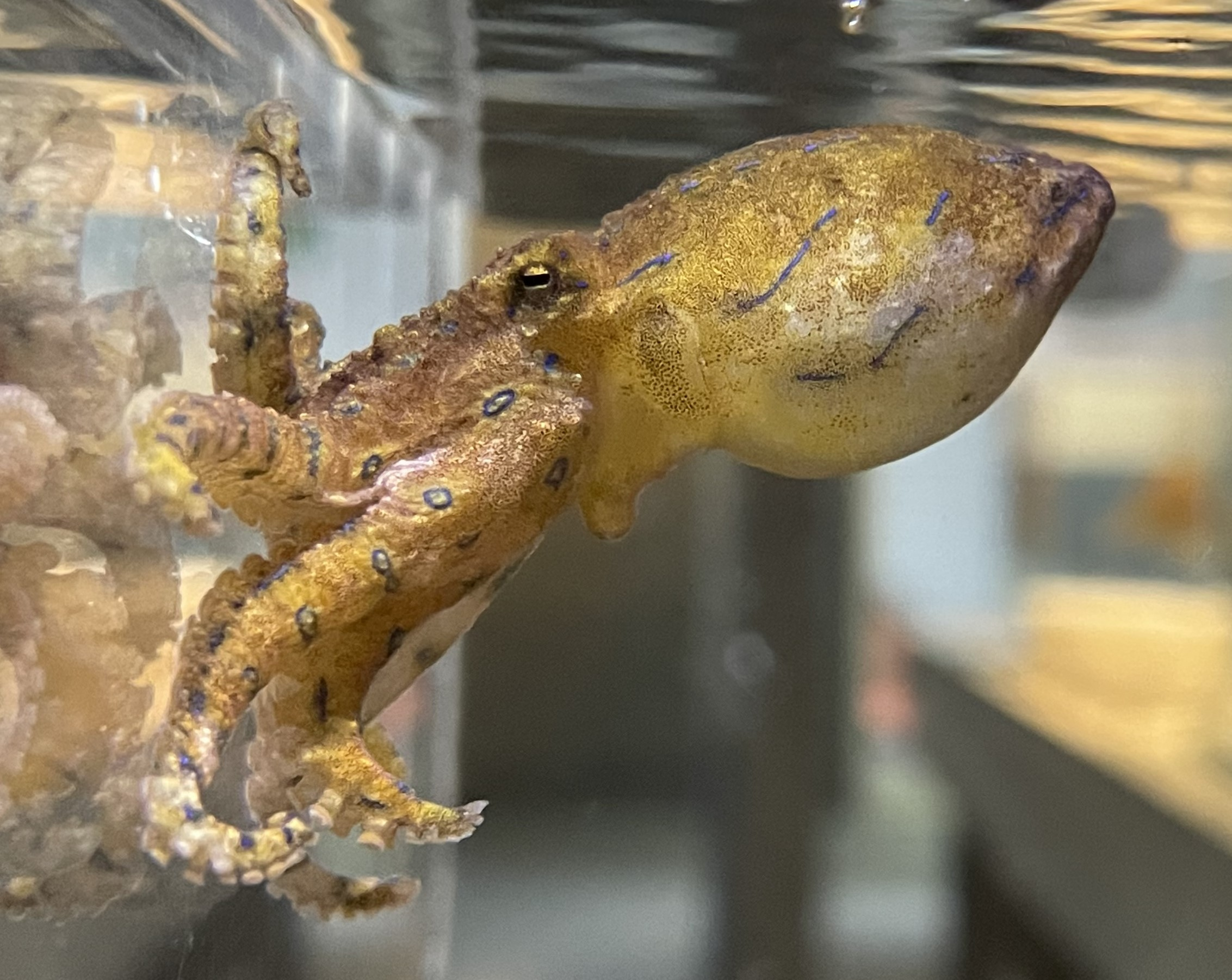

Conservation status
- Least Concern (IUCN 3.1)

Scientific classification
- Kingdom: Animalia
- Phylum: Mollusca
- Class: Cephalopoda
- Order: Octopoda
- Family: Octopodidae
- Genus: Hapalochlaena
- Species: H. fasciata

Binomial name
- Hapalochlaena fasciata (Hoyle, 1886)

Synonyms
- Octopus fasciatus (Hoyle, 1886); Octopus pictus subsp. fasciata Hoyle, 1886-01; Octopus pictus var. fasciata Hoyle, 1886; Octopus robustus Brock, 1887

= Blue-lined octopus =

Species of venomous cephalopod

The blue-lined octopus (Hapalochlaena fasciata) is one of four species of extremely venomous blue-ringed octopuses. It can be found in Pacific Ocean waters that stretch from Australia to Japan. It is most commonly found around intertidal rocky shores and coastal waters to a depth of 15 metres (49 ft) between southern Queensland and southern New South Wales. It is relatively small, with a mantle up to 45 millimetres (1.8 in) in length. In its relaxed state, it is a mottled yellow-brown with dark blue or black streaks covering the whole body apart from the underside of its arms, but its vibrant blue markings appear as a warning to predators when it feels threatened. Along with its other closely related species, the blue-lined octopus is regarded as one of the most dangerous animals in the sea, and its venom can be fatal to humans. This benthic octopus is one of four members of the genus Hapalochlaena, with the other species being the greater blue-ringed octopus (Hapalochlaena lunulata), southern blue-ringed octopus (Hapalochlaena maculosa), and the blue-ringed octopus (Hapalochlaena nierstraszi). The blue-lined octopus is the only species of the four to display lined iridescent blue marking, as opposed to circular iridescent blue marking that the three other species tend to exhibit.

== Behavior ==
Blue-lined octopuses tend to swim around shallow areas of coral reefs and tide pools. They often hide in crevices of reefs, empty seashells, and other ocean resources they can find to conceal their identity. Blue-lined octopuses are known to be nocturnal hunters, while other species in the genus such as the greater blue-ringed octopus (H. Lunulata) is known to be diurnal hunter. Prey for blue-lined octopuses mostly consists of crustaceans and stomatopods, however in captivity they have been recorded to eat live fish, suggesting they do in the wild as well. They do not use their venom (known as tetrodotoxin) to kill their prey, but instead trap it inside their arms and pierce them with its parrot-like beak.

== Features ==
The blue-lined octopus is about the size of a golf ball, having a mantle length of 45mm, it is the smallest out of the four species that make up the genus. While at rest blue-lined octopus are highly camouflaged, due to the presence of chromatophores under the skin they can rapidly change body coloration, using aposematic signals to display bright blue lines to predators. When it is resting, Its passive colors range from a light grey to beige. The visceral hump in blue-lined octopus is regularly pointed. When looking at blue-lined octopus they portray sexual dimorphism, along with this females tend to weigh more than males.

== Lethality ==
Blue-lined octopuses can be lethal to humans. Their saliva contain a special neurotoxin called tetrodotoxin. However, the species is more likely to flee and find shelter in an encounter due to their extremely shy nature. Nonetheless, there have been at least three reported human deaths from the blue-lined octopus. It poses most danger to those who pick up the octopus and physically touch it.

If a human is bitten by the octopus, the bite may not be felt at first due to the small injection apparatus of the octopus. After some time, symptoms of the injection include loss of feeling in the tongue/lips, muscle weakness/paralyzation, respiratory failure, unconsciousness, and eventually death. The tetrodotoxin in blue-lined octopuses is so lethal that it has been estimated that the venom from a single 25-gram octopus can kill about ten 75-kilogram humans.

This tetrodotoxin known as TTX has been located in the posterior salivatory gland, anterior salvatory gland, arm, mantle, digestive glands, testes, brachial heart, nephridia, gill, and oviducal gland in blue-lined octopuses. With TTX being located in the brachial heart, nephridia, and gills it suggests that there is a transport mechanism for TTX in the blood. TTX is known to be one of the most powerful marine biotoxins to humans, this is only released through a bite, or ingestion. Furthermore Hapalochlaena is the only genus of octopus to produce this biotoxin, which is thought to have played an important role in the evolution of the species.

== Reproduction ==
The blue-lined octopuses start reproducing at a year old. During breeding male blue-lined octopus will seek and mount females, they do not extend the hectocotylus and mate from a distance like other octopus species. If they are successful, the female octopus will lay 50 to 100 eggs 30 days after the encounter. During the 30 days, the female octopus hides her eggs under her arms and does not leave her hiding spot until the eggs hatch. After her eggs hatch, the female octopus dies. These eggs are large and produce benthic hatchlings, development for these hatchlings takes about two months.

Marine biologists in Australia have discovered that male blue-lined octopuses deliver a venomous bite straight to the female’s heart during mating. The male cautiously approaches the larger female, often from behind to reduce the risk of triggering aggression. The male bites her aorta, injecting tetrodotoxin (TTX). Within ~8 minutes, she's paralyzed as breathing slows, the body pales, and reflexes vanish, buying him time and safety. While she’s immobilized, the male uses his specialized hectocotylus arm to transfer spermatophores (sperm packets) into the female’s mantle cavity.

== Distribution ==
Blue-lined octopus are commonly found off the coast of Australia inhabiting shallow tropical and subtropical reef waters. However, in recent years they have been found to distribute throughout the Pacific Ocean. They have been recorded off the east coast of Japan, as well as off the coast of Jeju Island in Korea in 2015. This can suggest that the warming of ocean water has caused a shift in suitable habitat for these octopus, this shift is important to monitor as if can aid is public health and safety.
