= The Serpent and the Rainbow =

The Serpent and the Rainbow may refer to:

- The Serpent and the Rainbow (book), a 1985 non-fiction book by Wade Davis
- The Serpent and the Rainbow (film), a 1988 American horror film by Wes Craven, loosely based on the book
