= Serpent and the Rainbow =

The Serpent and the Rainbow can refer to:

- The Serpent and the Rainbow (book), a 1985 book by Wade Davis
- The Serpent and the Rainbow (film), a 1988 horror film based on the book
