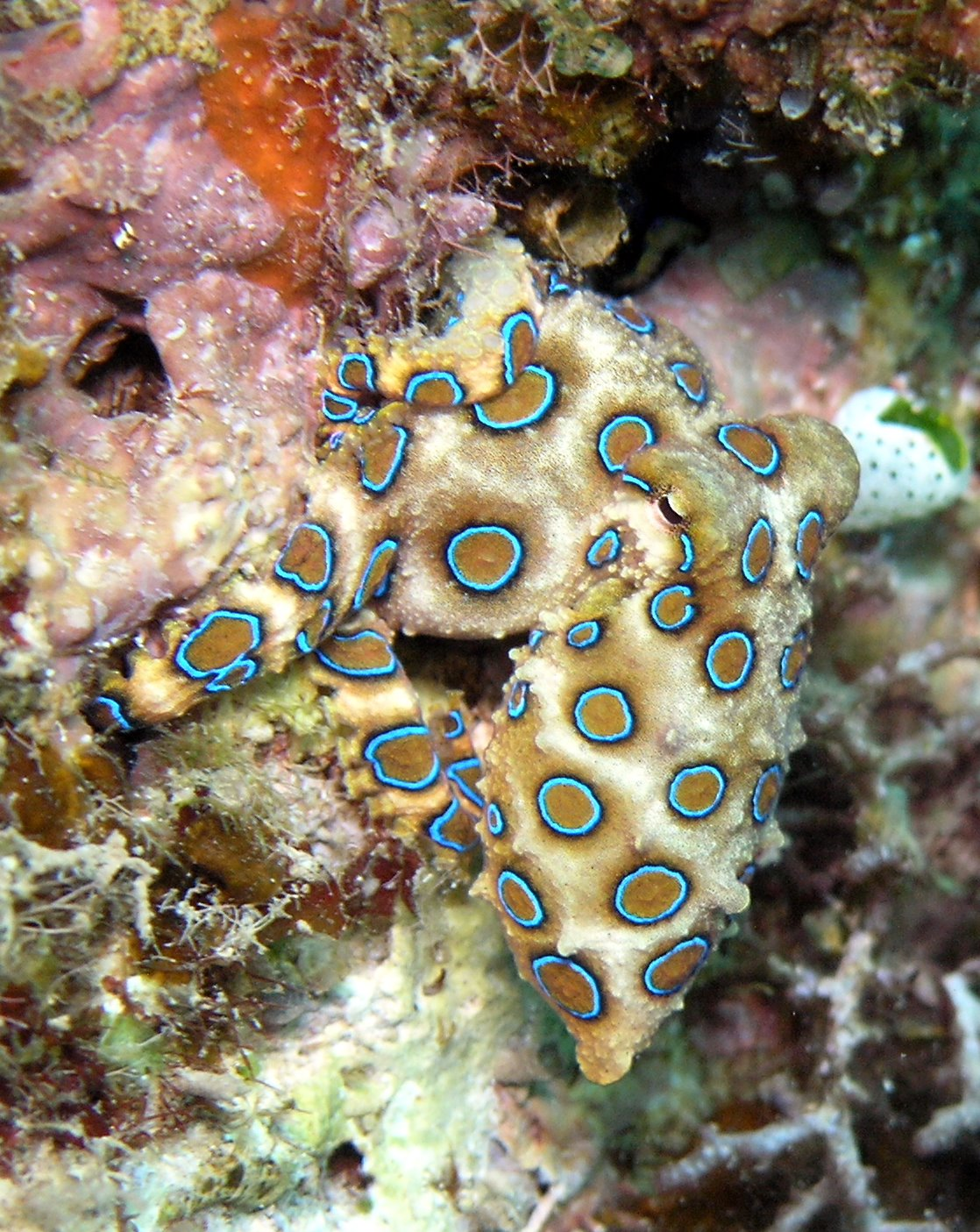
- Greater blue-ringed octopus (Hapalochlaena lunulata)

Scientific classification
- Kingdom: Animalia
- Phylum: Mollusca
- Class: Cephalopoda
- Order: Octopoda
- Family: Octopodidae
- Genus: Hapalochlaena; Robson, 1929

Type species
- Hapalochlaena lunulata Quoy & Gaimard, 1832

Species
- H. fasciata (Hoyle, 1886); H. lunulata (Quoy & Gaimard, 1832); H. maculosa Hoyle, 1883; H. nierstraszi (?) Adam, 1938

= Blue-ringed octopus =

Four species of mollusk

Blue-ringed octopuses, comprising the genus Hapalochlaena, are four extremely venomous species of octopus that can be found in shells between rocks and crevices in tide pools and also coral reefs in the Pacific and Indian Oceans, from Japan to Australia. They can be identified by their yellowish skin and characteristic blue and black rings that can change color dramatically when the animals are threatened. They eat small crustaceans, including crabs, hermit crabs, shrimp, and other small sea animals.

They are some of the world's most venomous marine animals. Despite their small size—12 to 20 cm (5 to 8 in)—and relatively docile nature, they are very dangerous if provoked when handled because their venom contains a powerful neurotoxin called tetrodotoxin.

The species tends to have a lifespan around two to three years, which may vary depending on factors such as nutrition, temperature, and the intensity of light within its environment.

== Classification ==
The genus was described by British zoologist Guy Coburn Robson in 1929. Four species of Hapalochlaena are confirmed, with six possible but still undescribed species being researched:

- Greater blue-ringed octopus (H. lunulata)
- Southern blue-ringed octopus or lesser blue-ringed octopus (H. maculosa)
- Blue-lined octopus (H. fasciata)
- H. nierstraszi was documented and described in 1938 from a single specimen found in the Bay of Bengal, with a second specimen caught and described in 2013.

== Behavior ==
Blue-ringed octopuses spend most of their time hiding in crevices while displaying effective camouflage patterns with their dermal chromatophore cells. Like all octopuses, they can change shape easily, which allows them to squeeze into small crevices. This, along with piling up rocks outside the entrance to their lairs, helps safeguard them from predators.

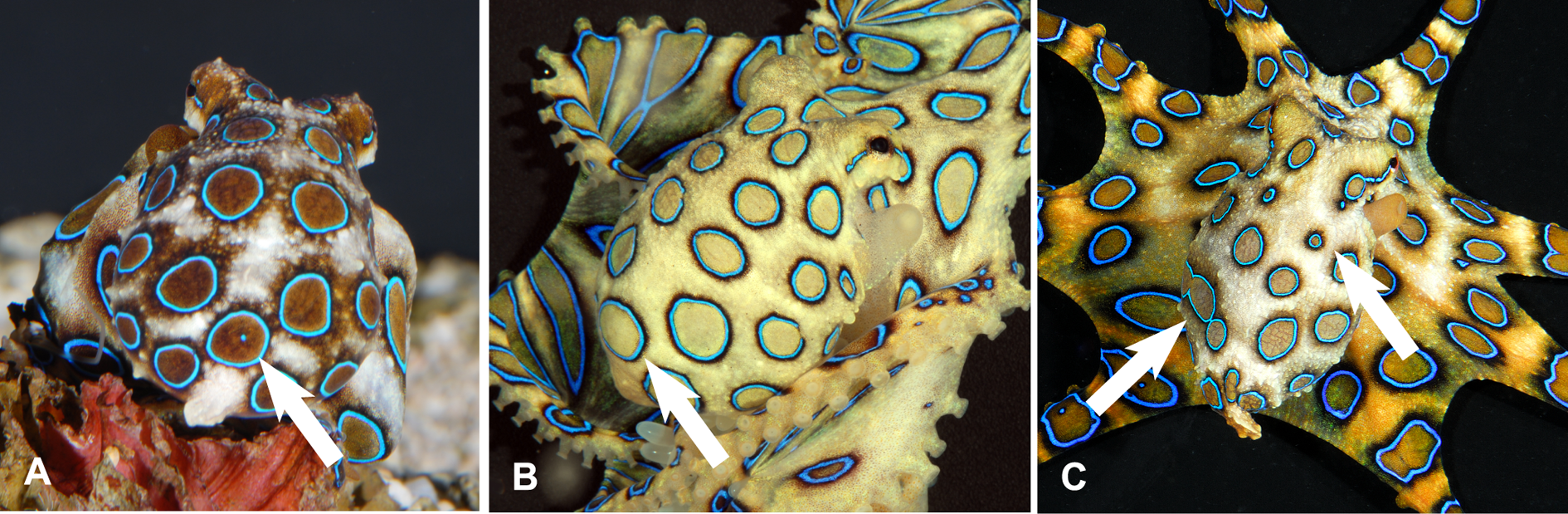
Variable ring patterns on mantles of Hapalochlaena lunulata

If they are provoked, they quickly change color, becoming bright yellow with each of the 50–60 rings flashing bright iridescent blue within a third of a second, as an aposematic warning display. In the greater blue-ringed octopus (H. lunulata), the rings contain multilayer light reflectors called iridophores. These are arranged to reflect blue–green light in a wide viewing direction. Beneath and around each ring are dark-pigmented chromatophores that can be expanded within one second to enhance the contrast of the rings. No chromatophores are above the ring, which is unusual for cephalopods, as they typically use chromatophores to cover or spectrally modify iridescence. The fast flashes of the blue rings are achieved using muscles that are under neural control. Under normal circumstances, each ring is hidden by contraction of muscles above the iridophores. When these relax and muscles outside the ring contract, the iridescence is exposed, thereby revealing the blue color.

Similar to other Octopoda, blue-ringed octopuses swim by expelling water from a funnel in a form of jet propulsion. They can also use chemotactile social recognition to influence their behavior. This trait is thought to be the driving force behind many evolved behavioral patterns such as mating, parental care, defense mechanisms, resource competition, and hunting strategies.

=== Feeding ===
The blue-ringed octopus feeds on fish and crustaceans. It pounces on its prey, seizing it with its arms and pulling it towards its mouth. It uses its horny beak to pierce through the tough crab or shrimp exoskeleton, releasing its venom. The venom paralyzes the muscles required for movement, which effectively kills the prey.

== Reproduction ==
The mating ritual for the blue-ringed octopus begins when a male approaches a female and begins to caress her with his modified arm, the hectocotylus. A male mates with a female by grabbing her, which sometimes completely obscures the female's vision, then transferring sperm packets by inserting his hectocotylus into her mantle cavity repeatedly. Mating continues until the female has had enough, and in at least one species, the female has to remove the over-enthusiastic male by force. Males attempt copulation with members of their own species regardless of sex or size, but interactions between males are most often shorter in duration and end with the mounting octopus withdrawing the hectocotylus without packet insertion or struggle.

Blue-ringed octopus females lay only one clutch of about 50 eggs in their lifetimes, towards the end of autumn. Eggs are laid and then incubated underneath the female's arms for about six months. During this process, the female does not eat. After the eggs hatch, the female dies, and the new offspring will reach maturity and be able to mate by the next year.

=== Mating behavior ===
In the southern blue-ringed octopus, body mass is observed to be the strongest factor that influences copulatory rates. Evidence of female preference for larger males is apparent, although no male preference for females is shown. In this species males possibly expend more effort than females to initiate copulation. Additionally, males are not likely to use odor cues to identify females with which to mate. Male-male mounting attempts are common in H. maculosa, indicating that no discrimination occurs between sexes. Male blue-ringed octopuses adjust mating durations based on the females' recent mating history. Termination of copulation is not likely to happen with a female if she has not yet mated with another male. Duration of mating is also found to be longer in these cases as well.

== Toxicity ==
The blue-ringed octopus, despite its small size, carries enough venom to kill over 20 adult humans within minutes. Their bites are tiny and often painless, with many victims not realizing they have been envenomated until respiratory depression and paralysis begins. No blue-ringed octopus antivenom is available.

=== Venom ===
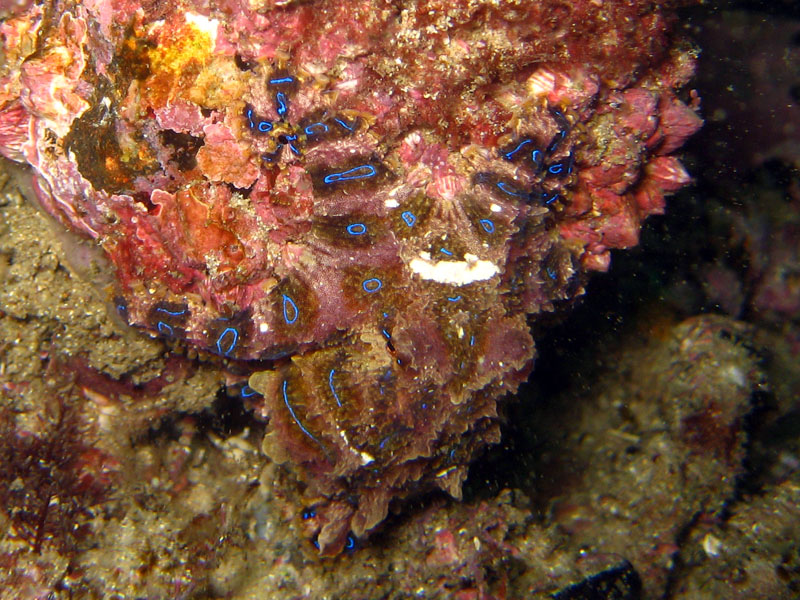
Blue-ringed octopus from New South Wales, Australia

The octopus produces venom containing tetrodotoxin, histamine, tryptamine, octopamine, taurine, acetylcholine, and dopamine. The venom can result in nausea, respiratory arrest, heart failure, severe and sometimes total paralysis, and blindness, and can lead to death within minutes if not treated. Death is usually caused by suffocation due to paralysis of the diaphragm.

The venom is produced in the posterior salivary gland of the octopus by endosymbiotic bacteria. The salivary glands possess a tubuloacinar exocrine structure and are located in the intestinal blood space.

The major neurotoxin component of the blue-ringed octopus is a compound originally known as "maculotoxin"; in 1978, this maculotoxin was found to be tetrodotoxin, a neurotoxin also found in pufferfish, rough-skinned newts, and some poison dart frogs; the blue-ringed octopus is the first reported instance in which tetrodotoxin is used as a venom. Tetrodotoxin blocks sodium channels, causing motor paralysis and respiratory arrest within minutes of exposure. The octopus's own sodium channels are adapted to be resistant to tetrodotoxin.

Direct contact is necessary to be envenomated. Faced with danger, the octopus's first instinct is to flee. If the threat persists, the octopus goes into a defensive stance, and displays its blue rings. If the octopus is cornered and touched, it may bite and envenomate its attacker.

The octopus generates the toxin in its muscles and skin, when it needs it for defense. One specific species (Hapalochlaena cf. fasciata) does not require physical contact to secrete the tetrodotoxin, it recognizes predator threats through sight and smell.

Estimates of the number of recorded human fatalities caused by blue-ringed octopuses vary, ranging from seven to 16 deaths; most scholars agree that at least 11 have occurred.

Tetrodotoxin can be found in nearly every organ and gland of its body. Even sensitive areas such as the Needham's sac, branchial heart, nephridia, and gills have been found to contain tetrodotoxin, and it has no effect on the octopus's normal functions. This may be possible through a unique blood transport. The mother will inject the neurotoxin (and perhaps the toxin-producing bacteria) into her eggs to make them generate their own venom before hatching.

=== Effects ===
Tetrodotoxin causes severe and often total body paralysis. Envenomation can result in victims being fully aware of their surroundings, but unable to move. Because of the paralysis, they have no way of signaling for help or indicating distress. The victim remains conscious and alert in a manner similar to the effect of curare or pancuronium bromide. This effect is temporary, and will fade over a period of hours as the tetrodotoxin is metabolized and excreted by the body. The symptoms vary in severity, with children being the most at risk because of their small body size.

=== Treatment ===
First aid treatment consists of pressure on the wound and artificial respiration once the paralysis has disabled the victim's respiratory muscles, which often occurs within minutes of being bitten. Because the venom primarily kills through paralysis, victims are frequently saved if artificial respiration is started and maintained before marked cyanosis and hypotension develop. Respiratory support until medical assistance arrives improves the victim's chances of survival. Definitive hospital treatment involves placing the patient on a ventilator until the toxin is removed by the body. Victims who survive the first 24 hours usually recover completely.

== Conservation ==
Currently, the blue-ringed octopus population information is listed as least concern according to the International Union for Conservation of Nature. Threats such as bioprospecting, habitat fragmentation, degradation, overfishing, and human disturbance, as well as species collections for aquarium trade, may be threats to blue-ringed octopus population numbers. Hapalochlaena may contribute to a variety of advantages to marine conservation. This genus of octopus provides stability of habitat biodiversity, as well as expanding the balance of marine food webs. Various species of blue-ringed octopuses may help control populations of Asian date mussels. Additionally, future research on tetrodotoxins produced by the blue-ringed octopus may produce new medicinal discoveries.

== In popular culture ==
In the 1983 James Bond film Octopussy, the blue-ringed octopus is the prominent symbol of the secret order of female bandits and smugglers, appearing in an aquarium tank, on silk robes, and as a tattoo on women in the order. In the novel State of Fear (2004) by author Michael Crichton, a character uses a blue-ringed octopus as an assassination weapon. A 2015 episode of The Adventure Zone featured a blue-ringed octopus in its "Petals to the Metal" series.
