= Tectin =

Tectin may refer to:

- Tectin (drug) - for treatment of pain
- Tectin (secretion) - a proteinaceous substance secreted by protists
