= Narahashi =

Narahashi (written: 楢橋, 名良橋 or 奈良橋) is a Japanese surname. Notable people with the surname include:

- Akira Narahashi (名良橋 晃, born 1971), Japanese footballer
- Asako Narahashi (楢橋 朝子, born 1959), Japanese photographer
- Miki Narahashi (楢橋 美紀, born 1960), Japanese voice actress
- Toshio Narahashi (1927–2013), Japanese pharmacologist
- Yoko Narahashi (奈良橋 陽子, born 1947), Japanese casting director and film producer
