= Clairvius Narcisse =

Haitian self-claimed zombie (1922–1994)

- Born: January 2, 1922; L'Estère, Haiti
- Died: 1994 (aged 71–72); Haiti
- Resting place: L'Estère
- Other name: The Living Zombie
- Known for: Allegedly being a zombie

Clairvius Narcisse (January 2, 1922 – 1994) was a Haitian man who claimed to have been turned into a zombie by a practitioner of Haitian Vodou, and forced to work as a slave.

One hypothesis for Narcisse's account was that he had been administered a neurotoxin such as the paralyzing pufferfish venom tetrodotoxin, which rendered him helpless and seemingly dead. The greatest proponent of this possibility was Wade Davis, a graduate student in ethnobotany at Harvard University.

== Biography ==
Narcisse admitted himself to the Schweitzer Hospital (operated by American medical staff) in Deschapelles, Haiti, on April 30, 1962. He had a fever and fatigue, and was spitting up blood. Doctors could find no explanation for his symptoms, which gradually grew worse until he appeared to die three days later. He was pronounced dead, and held in cold storage for about a day before burial.

In 1980, a man identifying himself as Clairvius Narcisse approached Angelina Narcisse, the deceased's sister, in the city of L'Estère. Narcisse was immediately recognized by his family and several other villagers, and he further convinced them of his identity by using a childhood nickname and sharing intimate family information. He recounted that he had been conscious but paralyzed during his supposed death and burial, and had subsequently been removed from his grave and forced to work at a sugar plantation.

Per his account, after his apparent death and subsequent burial on May 2, 1962, his coffin was exhumed and he was given a paste (possibly made from Datura, which at certain doses has a hallucinogenic effect and can cause memory loss). The bokor who recovered him then reportedly forced him, alongside others, to work on a sugar plantation until the bokor's death two years later. When the bokor died (and, potentially, regular doses of the hallucinogen ceased), he eventually regained sanity. Because the instigator of the poisoning was suspected to be Clairvius's brother, with whom he had quarreled over land and inheritance, Clairvius only returned home once he heard of his brother's death, 16 years later.

When he told them the story of how he was dug up from his grave and enslaved, the villagers were surprised, but they believed his story that he had been a zombie. When questioned, Narcisse told investigators that the sorcerer involved had "taken his soul".

It has been suggested that one reason that Narcisse had been targeted to become a zombie was because he had abandoned his children.

== Investigation and hypothesis ==
This case puzzled many doctors because Narcisse's death was documented and verified by the testimonies of two American doctors. The case of Narcisse was argued to be the first verifiable example of the transformation of an individual into a zombie.

Narcisse's story intrigued Haitian psychiatrist Lamarque Douyon. Though dismissing supernatural explanations, Douyon believed there was some degree of truth to tales of zombies and he had been studying such accounts for decades. Suspecting that zombies were somehow drugged and then revived, Douyon reached out to colleagues in America. Canadian ethnobotanist Wade Davis traveled to Haiti, where he obtained samples of powders purportedly used to create zombies.

After various anthropological investigations of "zombie" stories, Davis hypothesized that a bokor had given Narcisse a dose of a powdered chemical mixture containing tetrodotoxin (a pufferfish toxin) and bufotoxin (a toad toxin) through abraded skin, inducing a coma that mimicked the appearance of death. He was then allowed to return to his home where he collapsed, "died", and was buried. Davis based this claim on the presumption that tetrodotoxin and related toxins are not always fatal, but at near-lethal doses can leave a person in a state of near-death for several days with the person remaining conscious. Davis then hypothesized that Narcisse was dosed with Datura stramonium after his body was recovered to create a compliant zombie-like state until the bokor died and he stopped receiving Datura.

Davis does not suggest that the zombie powder containing tetrodotoxin was used for maintaining "mental slaves", but for producing the initial death and resurrection that convinced the victims and those who knew them that they had become zombies.

== Skepticism ==
While these popular accounts suggested that tetrodotoxin was used in Vodou preparations of zombie poisons, subsequent analysis has repeatedly challenged earlier studies on technical grounds. Later research failed to identify the toxin in any such preparation, and discussion of tetrodotoxin in this context has all but disappeared from the primary literature since the early 1990s. In a paper published in 1986, toxicologists Chen-Yuan Kao and Toshio Yasumoto concluded that "the widely circulated claim in the lay press to the effect that tetrodotoxin is ... [the] causal agent" in a "zombification process" is "without factual foundation".

Kao, of the State University of New York, when interviewed on the matter in 1988, stated, "I actually feel this is an issue of fraud in science". A supporter of Davis, Bo Holmstedt of the Karolinska Institute, argued that it was "not deliberated fraud," but accused Davis of "withholding negative data" (i.e., data which fails to support the desired conclusions) and called his work "simply bad science".

Davis responded formally to the charges, arguing the variability of the preparations and possible ineptitude in dissolving the toxin could have explained Kao's inability to detect it. He also speculated that "other ingredients" in the preparations might help "enable transport across the blood–brain barrier," suggesting this could make the toxin effective at significantly smaller doses, and arguing that "only when the bokor... causes others to believe the victim is dead and then revived" do his efforts become apparent, and that only a single "success... would be sufficient to support the cultural belief in the... phenomenon." As of 1990, his critics were unpersuaded, and no subsequent literature has appeared to support the original contentions, although lively popular discussion continues.

== Cinema ==
Narcisse's story was loosely adapted into The Serpent and the Rainbow, a 1988 American horror film directed by Wes Craven.

Zombi Child, a 2019 French drama film, is also inspired by his story.

A Haitian toxin causing zombification was the inspiration for the BBC's Father Brown episode 10 in season 4.
