= The Serpent and the Rainbow (book) =

1985 book by Wade Davis

The Serpent and the Rainbow: A Harvard Scientist's Astonishing Journey into the Secret Societies of Haitian Voodoo, Zombis, and Magic
- Cover of the first edition
- Author: Wade Davis
- Language: English
- Subject: Haitian Vodou
- Publisher: Simon & Schuster
- Publication date: 1985
- Publication place: United States
- Media type: Print (Hardcover and Paperback)
- Pages: 304 pp
- ISBN: 978-0-684-83929-5
- OCLC: 37462868

The Serpent and the Rainbow: A Harvard Scientist's Astonishing Journey into the Secret Societies of Haitian Voodoo, Zombies, and Magic is a 1985 book by anthropologist and researcher Wade Davis. He investigated Haitian Vodou and the process of making zombies. He studied ethnobotanical poisons, claiming to discover their use in a reported case of a contemporary zombie, Clairvius Narcisse.

== Overview ==
The book presents the case of Clairvius Narcisse, a man who claims to have been a zombie for two years. While Narcisse claims the zombie state is from the supernatural influence of a bokor, Davis argues that the zombification process was more likely the result of a complex interaction of tetrodotoxin, a powerful hallucinogenic plant called Datura, and cultural forces and beliefs.

According to the book, the assortment of ingredients in Haitian zombie powder include puffer fish, matter from a corpse (specifically to Davis' adventure in Haiti, the bokor crushed the skull of a deceased infant that had been dead for a month or two, and added it to the poison), freshly killed blue lizards, a large dried toad (Bufo marinus) with a dried sea worm wrapped around it (prepared beforehand), "tcha-tcha" (Albizzia), and "itching pea" (pois grater, a species of Mucuna).

The book inspired the 1988 horror film of the same name.

== Criticism ==
Davis' claims were criticized for a number of scientific inaccuracies. Some scientists found little or no tetrodotoxin in samples provided by Davis, with some accusing him of fraud. Davis argued that a number of factors may account for the negative results of some investigators and decried their unsubstantiated accusations of fraud, noting the variability of formulations, possible errors in the testing performed on the samples he brought back, the possibility that the tetrodotoxin-based mixture may have had ingredients that improved blood–brain barrier transmission of the tetrodotoxin, and the nature of folk medicine with respect to success rates (i.e., that very few successes are required to establish credibility).
