= Wade Davis (anthropologist) =

Canadian anthropologist (born 1953)

Wade Davis CM
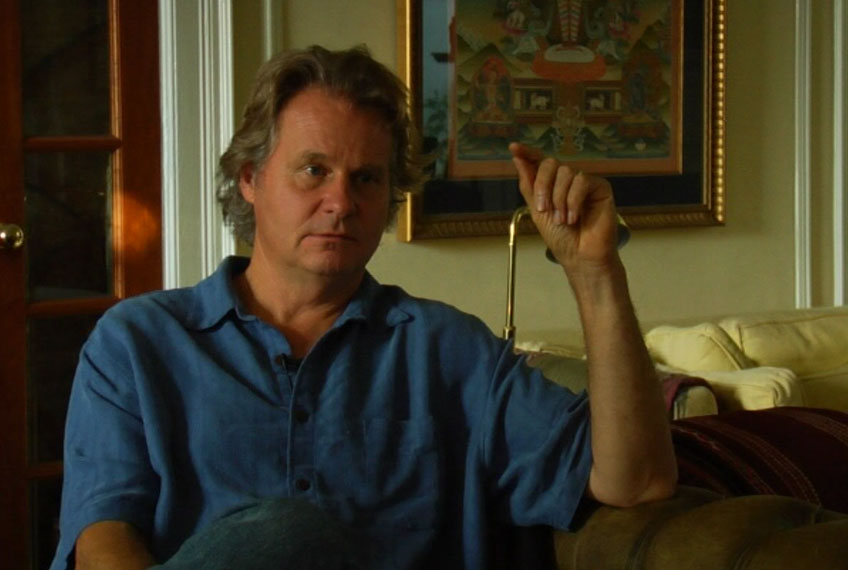
- Davis in 2008
- Born: Edmund Wade Davis; December 14, 1953 (age 72); West Vancouver, British Columbia, Canada
- Citizenship: Canada; United States; Colombia
- Spouse: Gail Percy
- Children: 2

Academic background
- Education: Harvard University (Ph.D.)

Academic work
- Discipline: Cultural anthropologist; ethnobotanist
- Institutions: University of British Columbia
- Notable works: The Serpent and the Rainbow (1985)
- Website: daviswade.com

Edmund Wade Davis CM (born December 14, 1953) is a Canadian cultural anthropologist, ethnobotanist, photographer, and writer.

Davis came to prominence with his 1985 best-selling book The Serpent and the Rainbow about the zombies of Haiti. He is professor of anthropology and the BC Leadership Chair in Cultures and Ecosystems at Risk at the University of British Columbia.

== Early life, family, and education ==
Davis was born in West Vancouver, British Columbia, Canada. He holds degrees in anthropology and biology, and earned his Ph.D. in ethnobotany, all from Harvard University.

In 1974, at age 20, Davis crossed the Darién Gap on foot in the company of the English author and amateur explorer Sebastian Snow.

== Career ==
Beyond his scientific career, Davis is also an active writer, photographer, and filmmaker. He is a licensed river guide and has worked as a park ranger and forestry engineer.

=== Anthropology and ethnobotany ===
Mostly through the Harvard Botanical Museum, he spent three years in the Amazon and Andes as a plant explorer, living among fifteen indigenous groups in eight Latin American nations, while making some 6,000 botanical collections. He conducted ethnographic fieldwork among several indigenous societies of northern Canada. His work later took him to Haiti to investigate folk preparations implicated in the creation of zombies, an assignment that led to his writing Passage of Darkness (1988) and The Serpent and the Rainbow (1986), a bestseller. The book was used loosely as the basis of a Wes Craven horror film, The Serpent and the Rainbow (1988).

Other books by Davis include Penan: Voice for the Borneo Rain Forest (1990), Nomads of the Dawn (1995), One River (1996), which was nominated for the 1997 Governor General's Literary Award for nonfiction, Shadows in the Sun (1998),The Clouded Leopard (1998), Rainforest (1998), Light at the Edge of the World (2001), The Lost Amazon (2004), Grand Canyon (2008), Book of Peoples of the World (ed. 2008). His books have been translated into 14 languages

He has published 1800 articles on subjects from Haitian Vodo, Amazonian myth and religion, the traditional use of psychotropic drugs, the ethnobotany of South American Indians, as well as, how COVID-19 has signaled the end of the American era. Davis has written for National Geographic, Newsweek, Premiere, Outside, Omni, Harpers, Fortune, Men's Journal, Condé Nast Traveler, Natural History, Scientific American, National Geographic Traveler, The New York Times, Wall Street Journal, Washington Post, The Globe and Mail, Rolling Stone, and numerous other international publications.

Davis is a Fellow of the International League of Conservation Photographers (iLCP). Davis served as Explorer-in-Residence with the National Geographic Society from 2000 to 2013.

Davis' 2012 book Into the Silence: The Great War, Mallory and the Conquest of Everest won the Baillie Gifford Prize (formerly the Samuel Johnson prize) for non-fiction. His account weaves together the three Everest expeditions in 1922, 1923 and 1924, set in the shadow of the Great War, by finding "a unifying thread in the person of George Mallory, the scatter-brained Adonis and Bloomsbury favourite whose fate would enthral the nation," wrote John Keay in Literary Review.

=== Photography ===
His photographs have appeared in some 20 books and more than 80 magazines, journals, and newspapers, including National Geographic, Time, GEO, People, Men's Journal, Outside, and National Geographic Adventure. They have been exhibited at the International Center of Photography (ICP), the Marsha Ralls Gallery (Washington, D.C.), the United Nations (Cultures on the Edge exhibition 2004), the Carpenter Center of Harvard University, and the Utama Center (Kuala Lumpur, Malaysia). Some of his images are part of the permanent collection of the U.S. State Department, Africa and Latin America Bureaus. Davis is the co-curator of The Lost Amazon: The Photographic Journey of Richard Evans Schultes, first exhibited at the National Museum of Natural History, Smithsonian Institution, and currently touring Latin America. A first collection of Davis's photographs, Light at the Edge of the World, appeared in 2001 published by National Geographic Books, Bloomsbury, and Douglas & McIntyre. A second collection was under contract for 2013 publication with Douglas & McIntyre as well.

=== Filmmaking and other media involvement ===
Davis was the series creator, host, and co-writer of Light at the Edge of the World, a four-hour ethnographic documentary series, shot in Rapa Nui, Tahiti, the Marquesas, Nunavut, Greenland, Nepal, and Peru, which aired in 165 countries on the National Geographic Channel and in the USA on Smithsonian Networks.

He is featured in the MacGillivray Freeman IMAX film Grand Canyon Adventure: River at Risk, released in the spring of 2008. Other television credits include the award-winning documentaries Spirit of the Mask, Cry of the Forgotten People, Forests Forever, and Earthguide, a 13-part television series on the environment that aired on the Discovery Channel in 1990. His four-hour series with National Geographic, Ancient Voices / Modern World, was shot in Australia, Mongolia, and Colombia. It has been broadcast worldwide on the National Geographic Channel as part of the second season of Light at the Edge of the World.

In 2022 Davis curated an exhibition at the Bowers Museum in Santa Ana, California that highlighted the history of expeditions to the peak of Mount Everest. The exhibition "Ascent to Glory," included photographs, films and artifacts from five expeditions from the period 1921 to 1953. The Bowers Museum presented the exhibition in partnership with London's Royal Geographical Society.

=== Advisory work ===
An honorary research associate of the Institute of Economic Botany of the New York Botanical Garden, he is a Fellow of the Linnean Society, a Fellow of the Explorer's Club, a Fellow of the Royal Geographical Society, and a Fellow of the Royal Canadian Geographical Society. Davis was a founding board member of the David Suzuki Foundation and completed a six-year term on the board of the Banff Centre, a Canadian institution for the arts. He has served on the board of directors since 2009 for the Amazon Conservation Association, whose mission is to conserve the biological diversity of the Amazon. In 2009, he delivered the CBC Massey Lectures, Canada's most prestigious public intellectual forum.

He is a member of the International Advisory Board, Hunt Consolidated, PLNG, and has also been engaged in Journey to Zero, a three-year campaign sponsored by Nissan and TBWA to support zero emission vehicles.

== Criticisms of work in Haiti ==
In 1983, Davis first advanced his hypothesis that tetrodotoxin (TTX) poisoning could explain the existence of Haitian zombies. This idea has been controversial and his 1985 follow-up book (The Serpent and the Rainbow) elaborating upon this claim has been criticized as containing scientific inaccuracies. A point questioned is whether Bokors or Caplatas (the priests and priestesses) who are associated with creating "zombies" can keep "zombies" in a pharmacologically induced trance for many years. As part of his Haitian investigations, Davis commissioned the exhumation of a recently buried child. (Dead human tissue is supposed to be a part of the "zombie powder" used by Bokors and Caplatas to produce zombies.) This has been criticized as a breach of ethics.

The strictly scientific criticism of Davis's zombie project has focused on the claims about the chemical composition of the "zombie powder". Several samples of the powder were analyzed for TTX levels by experts in 1986. They reported that only "insignificant traces of tetrodotoxin [were found] in the samples of 'zombie powder' which were supplied for analysis by Davis" and that "it can be concluded that the widely circulated claim in the lay press to the effect that tetrodotoxin is the causal agent in the initial zombification process is without factual foundation". Davis's claims were subsequently defended by other scientists doing further analyses, and these findings were criticized in turn for poor methodology and technique by the original skeptics.

Aside from the question of whether or not "zombie powder" contains significant amounts of TTX, the underlying concept of "tetrodotoxin zombification" has also been questioned more directly on a physiological basis. TTX, which blocks sodium channels on the neural membrane, produces numbness, slurred speech, and possibly, paralysis or even respiratory failure and death in severe cases. As an isolated pharmacological agent, it is not known to produce the trance-like or "mental slave" state typical of the zombies of Haitian mythology.

== Personal life ==
Davis is married. He and his wife, Gail Percy, have lived in several places, sometimes with concurrent residences in Washington, D.C., Vancouver, the Stikine Valley of northern British Columbia, and Bowen Island. They have two adult daughters, Tara and Raina. On April 13, 2018, Davis was granted Colombian nationality and citizenship by President Juan Manuel Santos.

== Awards and accolades ==
- 2002: Lowell Thomas Medal (The Explorers Club)
- 2002: Lannan Foundation $125,000 prize for literary non-fiction
- 2003: Honorary Degree (Doctorate of Sciences) from University of Victoria
- 2004: Honorary Member of The Explorers Club, one of twenty
- 2008: Honorary Degree, University of Guelph
- 2009: Gold Medal of The Royal Canadian Geographical Society
- 2009: Speaker for the Massey Lectures, for his publication, The Wayfinders
- 2011: The Explorers Medal — the highest award of The Explorers Club
- 2010: Honorary Degree, Colorado College
- 2010: Honorary Doctorate of Laws, University of Northern British Columbia
- 2012: David Fairchild Medal for Plant Exploration, considered the most prestigious prize for botanical exploration.
- 2012: Samuel Johnson Prize, winner, Into the Silence
- 2012: Boardman Tasker Prize for Mountain Literature, shortlist, Into the Silence
- 2012: Governor General's Literary Award, shortlist, Into the Silence
- 2012: Banff Mountain Book Festival, Mountain & Wilderness Literature, finalist, Into the Silence
- 2015: Order of Canada with the grade of member
- 2017: Roy Chapman Andrews Society Distinguished Explorer Award
- 2017: Sir Christopher Ondaatje Medal for Exploration from the Royal Canadian Geographical Society

== Publications ==
=== As author ===
- Davis, Wade (1985). The Serpent and the Rainbow. New York: Simon & Schuster. ISBN 0-671-50247-6.
  - 1997 edition retitled: The Serpent and the Rainbow: A Harvard Scientist's (Note: Though he has degrees including a Ph.D. from the university, Davis was never a staff member at Harvard) Astonishing Journey into the Secret Societies of Haitian Voodoo, Zombies, and Magic.
- Davis, Wade (1988). Passage of Darkness: The Ethnobiology of the Haitian Zombie. Robert F. Thompson, Richard E. Schultes. University of North Carolina Press. ISBN 0-8078-1776-7.
- Davis, Wade and Thom Henley (1990), Penan Voice for the Borneo Rain Forest, Western Canada Wilderness.
- Davis, Wade (1991), The Art of Shamanic Healing, Cross Cultural Shamanism Network.
- Davis, Wade (1996). One River: Explorations and Discoveries in the Amazon Rain Forest. New York: Simon & Schuster. ISBN 0-684-80886-2.
- Davis, Wade (1998). Shadows in the Sun: Travels to Landscapes of Spirit and Desire. Island Press. ISBN 1-55963-354-9. (Published in Canada as The Clouded Leopard: A Book of Travels, Douglas & McIntyre, 1998.)
- Davis, Wade (2001). Light at the Edge of the World: A Journey Through the Realm of Vanishing Cultures. National Geographic. ISBN 0-7922-6474-6.
- Davis, Wade (2009). The Wayfinders: Why Ancient Wisdom Matters in the Modern World. Toronto: Anansi Press. ISBN 978-0-88784-766-0.
- Davis, Wade (2009). Grand Canyon: River at Risk. San Rafael, CA: Earth Aware Editions. ISBN 978-1-60109-013-3.
- Davis, Wade (2011). Into the Silence: The Great War, Mallory and the Conquest of Everest. New York: Alfred A. Knopf. ISBN 978-0-37540-889-2.
- Davis, Wade (2012). River Notes: A Natural and Human History of the Colorado. Washington, D.C.: Island Press. ISBN 978-1-61091-361-4.
- Davis, Wade (2015). Los guardianes de la sabiduría ancestral. Su importancia en el mundo moderno. Medellín, Colombia: Sílaba Editores. ISBN 978-958-8794-65-5.
- Davis, Wade, The Unraveling of America, Rolling Stone, August 6, 2020 - (how COVID-19 signals the end of the American era)
- Davis, Wade (2020). Magdalena: River of Dreams: A Story of Colombia. New York, NY: Knopf. ISBN 978-0375410994.
- Davis, Wade (2024). Beneath the Surface of Things: New and Selected Essays. Vancouver, BC: Greystone Books. ISBN 978-1778400445.

=== Photography books ===
- Davis, Wade, Ian MacKenzie, and Shane Kennedy (1995), Nomads of the Dawn: The Penan of the Borneo Rain Forest.
- Osborne, Graham (Photographs) and Wade Davis (Text) (1998), Rainforest: Ancient Realm of the Pacific Northwest White River Junction, Vermont, Chelsea Green Publishing Company.
- Davis, Wade (2004), The Lost Amazon: The Photographic Journey of Richard Evans Schultes, Chronicle Books (Intro by Andrew Weil).

=== As editor ===
- Davis, Wade and K. David Harrison (2008) Book of Peoples of the World: A Guide to Cultures, National Geographic, (2nd edition).

== Video ==
- Earthguide (1991). Cinetel Productions for the Discovery Channel. 13-part documentary on environmental issues. Davis was host and co-writer.
- "The Spirit of the Mask" (1992). Produced by Gryphon Productions. 1992. Davis was host and co-writer. 1 hour documentary.
- "Cry of the Forgotten Land" (1993). 1 hour documentary on the Moi people of West Papua, New Guinea. Davis was narrator/co-writer
- "The Explorer" Life and Times (2002). Produced by the Canadian Broadcasting Corporation (CBC) DVD by Monarch Films. 1 hour biographical documentary.
- "Grand Canyon: River at Risk" (2008). 3D IMAX, MacGillivray Freeman Films. Davis was principal character.
- Peyote to LSD: A Psychedelic Odyssey (2008). Produced in collaboration with Gryphon Productions. Filmed on location in New Mexico, Oaxaca, and lowland Ecuador. Two-hour special for the History Channel-based Davis's books One River (1996) and The Lost Amazon (2004). DVD available, A&E Television Network. Davis was host/co-writer/co-producer.
- Light at the Edge of the World: Science of the Mind (2007). Directed by Andrew Gregg, produced by Davis and Andrew Gregg for National Geographic.
- The Path of the Anaconda (2019). Directed by Alessandro Ángulo Brandestini, the documentary follows Davis as he travels to Colombia with anthropologist Martín von Hildebrand following the footsteps of Richard Evans Schultes.

== Media ==
Wade Davis on Bookbits radio.

- Davis's research into "Haitian Zombies" was explored in an episode of Science Channel's Dark Matters: Twisted But True.
- Davis's research into "Haitian Zombies" was mentioned in an episode of CUNY TV's Science Goes to the Movies.
- Davis's research into "Haitian Zombies" was referenced in the X-Files episode "Fresh Bones," season 2, episode 15.

== See also ==
- Timothy Plowman
