= Tectin (drug) =

Brand name for a pain killing drug derived from pufferfish

Tectin is the brand name of a pain killing drug currently in development by WEX Pharmaceuticals Inc. The drug is a purified version of the main toxin in the pufferfish, tetrodotoxin, a very potent neurotoxin which shuts down electrical signaling in nerves by blocking sodium channels on nerve cell membranes.

Tectin holds promise to relieve severe pain when other standard pain relievers are found to be ineffective. It is also being researched as a drug to relieve the symptoms of withdrawal in opiate addicts. The drug showed promising results in Canadian phase IIa clinical trials for the treatment of cancer related pain. However interim results from the phase IIb/III clinical trial where the drug did not meet the primary efficacy goal has led to the termination of this trial.

== See also ==
- Sodium channel blocker
