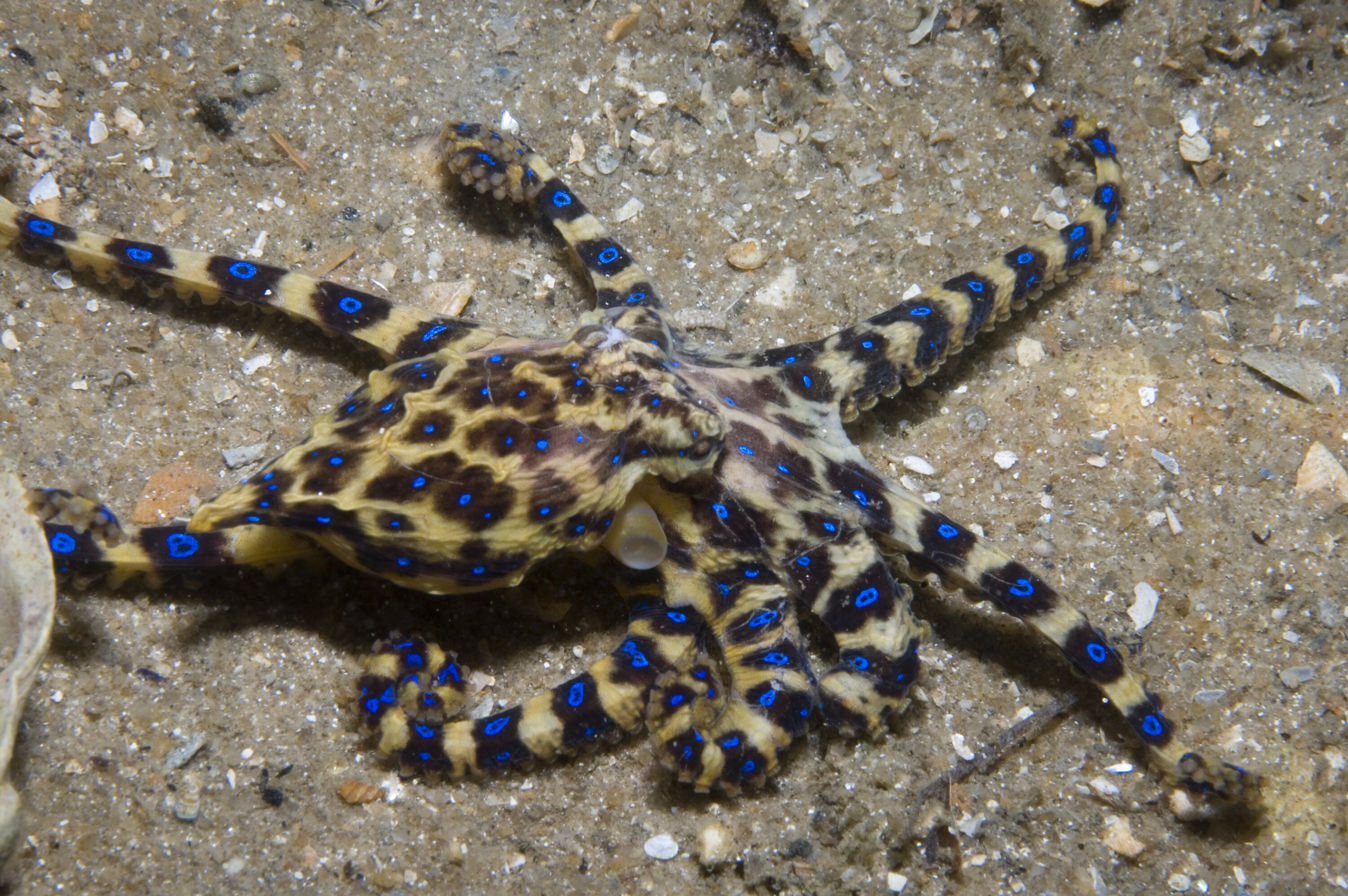
- Hapalochlaena maculosa in Blairgowrie, Victoria

Conservation status
- Least Concern (IUCN 3.1)

Scientific classification
- Kingdom: Animalia
- Phylum: Mollusca
- Class: Cephalopoda
- Order: Octopoda
- Family: Octopodidae
- Genus: Hapalochlaena; Robson, 1929
- Species: H. maculosa

Binomial name
- Hapalochlaena maculosa (Hoyle, 1883)

= Southern blue-ringed octopus =

Species of mollusc

The southern blue-ringed octopus (Hapalochlaena maculosa) is one of four extremely venomous species of blue-ringed octopuses. It is most commonly found in tidal rock pools along the south coast of Australia. As an adult, it can grow up to 20 centimetres (8 in) long (top of the mantle to the tip of the arms) and on average weighs 26 grams (0.9 oz). They are normally a docile species, but they are highly venomous, possessing venom capable of killing humans. Their blue rings appear with greater intensity when they become aggravated or threatened.

== Description ==
The blue-ringed species are known for their small size, yet the southern variety is hailed as the largest of the genus. As a result, they have been classified as their own species. From arm to arm, most of these octopuses are no larger than 20 centimeters. This is larger by roughly 5 centimeters on average with other varieties of the blue-ringed octopus. When at peace, their coloring is often a drab, mucus like color. However, once it feels sufficiently threatened, the eponymous blue-rings suddenly appear. These octopuses have an average of about 60 rings that have multilayer reflectors that allow them to flash a blue green color. These rings typically appear about 6 weeks after hatching (Mäthger et al.). For the rings to illuminate and glow, the muscles around the rings must contract while the muscles above them must relax (Mäthger et al.). This method of muscle contraction and relaxation has not been seen in other illuminating animals (Mäthger et al.)

== Nomenclature ==
Like other species of the blue-ringed octopus, this variety is named for the vibrant blue rings that it displays when agitated.

== Range and habitat ==
Found along the southern coasts of Australia, H. maculosa inhabits crevasses and cracks in the rocky reefs signature to this section of the Australian coast. In addition, the octopus enjoys a proximity to the plentiful forests of seagrass.

== Behavior ==
Southern blue-ringed octopuses tend to be passive and relatively harmless: they generally use their toxins only when hunting or provoked. They are nocturnal. They expel a jet of water for propulsion. Like other members of the genus, they live in burrows.

== Diet ==
The prey of H. maculosa consists mostly of lobsters, crabs, shrimp, and shellfish (including bivalve mollusks), as well as the occasional small fish. H. maculosa makes use of its venom for feeding purposes. It pins down and injects it through its beak. This totally paralyzes its prey, often killing it outright. This readies it for feeding. Another tactic it uses to hunt is releasing its venom as a mist into a location where its prey is commonly found. Their prey swim into the venom and become paralyzed, allowing for an attack.

== Life span and reproduction ==
H. maculosa has a very short life span with a large importance placed on reproduction. The average life span of a southern blue ringed octopus is around seven months. The octopus reaches sexual maturity at around four months old, at which time it focuses its last few months of life towards copulation and breeding. Both genders of this species are promiscuous, as they only have a limited set of gametes. The mating ritual of H. maculosa usually begins with the female initiating reproduction by changing color and posture. The male then mounts the female, inserts the hectocotylus under the mantle of the female, and releases the sperm into the female's oviduct. For this type of octopus, there is approximately a two-month window in which a female acquires and stores sperm from multiple males. She then carries the eggs with her, as opposed to depositing them somewhere stationary. During this time period, the mother rarely moves unless disturbed. When she is forced to move, she uses only two arms for locomotion. The female also does not eat during this time period. Because of this, the mother dies shortly after the eggs have hatched. It is highly unlikely that the male or female would live beyond one year. This unusual octopus maternal care system seems to be an advanced evolutionary development of the species. While this may seem strange, females only reproduce once in their lifetime, so it is vital to them that their egg clutch survives. Once hatched, the H. maculosa grow very rapidly. The southern blue-ringed octopus also differs from other marine invertebrates in that there is no planktonic stage. The young begin hunting around one month of age- they are said to be venomous from birth, while their blue rings do not appear until six weeks after hatching. It was found in a study by Morse and Zenger that as size of the octopus increased, so too did willingness to mate. Same-sex attempts at mating were frequently noted, which implies distinguishing between male and female is difficult even for the octopus. It is also possible females use some form of refined sense of smell to single out attractive mates.

== Mate and paternity choice ==
Many studies have been done on how southern blue-ringed octopuses choose their mates and if females can choose the sperm used to fertilize her eggs (Morse et al., 2018). Researchers have been interested in this topic specifically because the female can only reproduce once in her lifetime and because she can store the sperm of her many mates (Oceana). Researchers have hypothesized that there may be cryptic female choice or sperm competition (Morse et al., 2018). In the paper, Mating Behavior and Postcopulatory Fertilization Patterns in the Southern Blue-Ringed Octopus Hapalochlaena Maculosa, the authors study did not find that females choose the male sperm that will fertilize their eggs, though the "male that obtained less paternity than expected was in fact the female's full-sibling brother (Morse et al.)." Although this study did not find female selection of sperm, a separate study did find that females are picky about who they mate with. In the paper, Nocturnal Mating Behaviour and Dynamic Male Investment of Copulation Time in the Southern Blue-Ringed octopus, Hapalochlaena Maculosa (Cephalopoda: Octopodidae), Morse et al., found that females were more willing to mate with males that were larger and males that were larger attempted to mate more than smaller males. The same study also found that males would spend less time mating with females that they had already mated with.

== Venom ==
What makes this octopus famous is its venom. Salivary glands of the southern blue-ringed octopus produce the deadly neurotoxin, maculotoxin. The neurotoxin, tetrodotoxin (TTX), is secreted in the posterior salivary gland, which is located in the intestinal blood system of the octopus. This may provide the toxin into its bloodstream. The toxin has also been found in the eggs of this octopus. The method of poisoning is still not fully understood, but it is assumed that H. maculosa either injects the toxin into the water surrounding their prey through their saliva mixed with the toxin, or they directly bite their prey or predator with the beak-like mouth. Without immediate medical attention a bite is often fatal to humans. Various references in popular culture depict the southern blue-ringed octopus as a nefarious seadevil lying in wait to attack humans with its deadly toxins. In actuality, the venom is primarily used in hunting or for defense. There are no reported cases of unprovoked aggression towards humans. No antivenom exists.

== Conservation ==
There are currently no known conservation efforts for the southern blue-ringed octopus. This being said, it is likely that H. maculosa play an important role in their ecosystem, perhaps by controlling crustacean populations, so any efforts to conserve this species would be expected to benefit other species in the same habitat. It is also suggested that because the dispersal ability of H. maculosa is limited, connectivity between different populations of the species is especially vulnerable to habitat fragmentation or geographic barriers.
