= Branchial heart =

Accessory pump found in the heart of some cephalopods

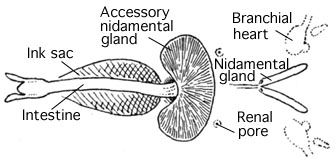
Ventral view of the viscera of Chtenopteryx sicula, showing the presence of the branchial hearts.

Branchial hearts are accessory pumps that supplement the action of the systemic heart in a cephalopod's body. They are myogenic in nature. Branchial hearts are always in pairs located at the base of the gills. Each branchial heart consists of a single chamber. They pump blood through the gills via the afferent branchial veins. Since they only circulate venous blood, branchial hearts function under predominantly anaerobic conditions. Branchial hearts also appear to be involved in hemocyanin synthesis.

Each branchial heart is directly connected to a branchial heart appendage or pericardial gland. The action of the branchial hearts is necessary for the production of primary urine in these appendages via pressure filtration. Branchial hearts may have evolved from the pericardial glands of nautiloids, such as those still found in modern nautiluses.
