= Toshio Narahashi =

Japanese pharmacologist (1927–2013)

Toshio Narahashi (January 30, 1927 – April 21, 2013) was an internationally known pharmacologist. He was the John Evans Professor of Pharmacology and former chair of the Department of Pharmacology at Northwestern University Feinberg School of Medicine, where he served on the faculty from 1977 to 2013. Prior, he was vice chairman of the Department of Physiology and Pharmacology at Duke University, where he served on the faculty from 1962 to 1977. He is considered by many to be the "founding father of neurotoxicology" and is credited with discovering how tetrodotoxin, the poison in puffer fish, immobilizes parts of the nervous system.

Born in Tokyo, Japan, Narahashi received an undergraduate degree in agriculture from the University of Tokyo in 1948. According to the Chicago Tribune, "He began his career studying insecticides in an entomology lab. His findings in the lab helped form the basis of 26 published papers and a doctorate in neurotoxicology that he would earn in 1960 from the University of Tokyo." He came to the U.S. in 1961 and quickly found work as a postdoctoral researcher at the University of Chicago before joining the faculty at Duke University.

Narahashi's seminal discoveries are:

- Ion channels as a basis for insecticidal actions
- Nerve sensitivity as a basis for the negative temperature dependence of insecticidal action of DDT
- Nerve sensitivity as a major mechanism explaining insecticide resistance leading eventually to the current concept of kdr and super-kdr
- Tetrodotoxin (TTX), the puffer fish poison, blocks sodium channels selectively and potently

Narahashi received numerous awards during his career, including:

- Society Award from the Society of Entomology and Zoology (1955)
- Cole Award from the Biophysical Society
- Javets Neuroscience Investigator Award from the National Institutes of Health (1986–1993)
- Burdick & Jackson International Award from the American Chemical Society (1989)
- Merit Award from the Society of Toxicology (1991)
- Otto Krayer Award from the American Society for Pharmacology and Experimental Therapeutics (2000)
- First Distinguished Investigator Lifetime Achievement Award in Neurotoxicology from the Society of Toxicology Neurotoxicology Specialty Section (2001)
- Honorary Member of the Japanese Pharmacology Society (2002)
- Distinguished Toxicology Scholar Award from the Society of Toxicology (2008)
