= The Serpent and the Rainbow (film) =

1988 American horror film

- Theatrical release poster
- Directed by: Wes Craven
- Screenplay by: Richard Maxwell; A.R. Simoun
- Based on: The Serpent and the Rainbow by Wade Davis
- Produced by: Doug Claybourne; David Ladd; Rob Cohen
- Starring: Bill Pullman; Cathy Tyson; Zakes Mokae; Paul Winfield; Brent Jennings; Michael Gough; Paul Guilfoyle; Dey Young; Luis Tavare Pesquera; William Newman; Francis Guinan; Jaime Pina Gautier; Philogen Thomas; Evencio Mosquera Slaco
- Cinematography: John Lindley
- Edited by: Glenn Farr
- Music by: Brad Fiedel
- Production company: Universal Pictures
- Distributed by: Universal Pictures
- Release date: February 5, 1988
- Running time: 98 minutes
- Country: United States
- Language: English
- Budget: $10 million
- Box office: $19.6 million

The Serpent and the Rainbow is a 1988 American horror film directed by Wes Craven and written by Richard Maxwell and Adam Rodman. It is loosely based on the non-fiction book of the same name by ethnobotanist Wade Davis, wherein Davis recounted his experiences in Haiti investigating the story of Clairvius Narcisse, who was allegedly poisoned, buried alive, and revived with an herbal brew which produced what was called a zombie. The film stars Bill Pullman, Cathy Tyson, Zakes Mokae, Paul Winfield, Brent Jennings, Michael Gough, and Paul Guilfoyle. The Serpent and the Rainbow was released in the United States by Universal Pictures on February 5, 1988.

== Plot ==
In 1978, a Haitian man named Christophe mysteriously dies in a French missionary clinic while a voodoo parade marches past his window. The next morning, Christophe is buried in a traditional Catholic funeral. A mysterious man dressed in a suit, who was outside Christophe's hospital window on the night he died, is in attendance. As the coffin is lowered into the ground, Christophe's eyes open and tears roll down his cheeks.

Seven years later, Harvard anthropologist Dennis Alan is in the Amazon rainforest studying rare herbs and medicines with a local shaman. He drinks a potion and experiences a hallucination of the suited man from Christophe's funeral, surrounded by corpses in a bottomless pit.

Back in Boston, Alan is approached by a pharmaceutical company looking to investigate a drug used in voodoo to create zombies in the hopes of using it as a "super anesthetic." The company provides Alan with funding and sends him to Haiti, which is in the middle of a revolution. Alan's expedition, assisted by Dr. Marielle Duchamp, locates Christophe, who is alive after having been buried. Alan is taken into custody, and the commander of the Tonton Macoute, Captain Dargent Peytraud—the same man from Christophe's funeral and Alan's vision in the Amazon—warns Alan to leave Haiti.

Continuing his investigation, Alan finds a local man, Mozart, who is reported to have knowledge of the procedure for creating the zombie drug. He pays Mozart for a sample, but Mozart sells him rat poison instead. After embarrassing Mozart in public, Alan persuades Mozart to show Alan how to produce the drug for a fee of $1,000. Alan is arrested again by the Tonton Macoutes, tortured by having a nail driven through his scrotum, and then dumped on a street with the message that he must leave Haiti or face death. Alan again refuses to leave and meets with Mozart to create the drug.

Alan has a nightmare of Peytraud, revealed to be a bokor who turns enemies into zombies and steals their souls. When Alan wakes up, he is lying next to Christophe's sister who has been decapitated. The Tonton Macoutes enter, take photos and frame Alan for murder. Peytraud tells Alan to leave the country and never return, lest he be convicted of the murder, executed and then his soul stolen by Peytraud. Alan is put on a U.S.-bound plane, but Mozart sneaks on board and gives Alan the zombie drug. Mozart asks Alan to tell people about him, so that Mozart can achieve international fame. Alan agrees and returns to Boston with his mission apparently completed.

At a celebration dinner, the wife of Alan's employer is possessed by Peytraud, who warns Alan of his own imminent death. Alan returns to Haiti, where his only ally, a houngan named Lucien Celine, is killed by Peytraud, and Mozart is beheaded as a sacrifice for Peytraud's power. Alan is sprayed with the zombie powder and dies; later, Peytraud steals Alan's body from the hospital before the death can be reported to the U.S. embassy. Peytraud takes Alan to a graveyard where, helpless in his coffin, Alan sees that Peytraud has captured Marielle and will sacrifice her. Peytraud shows Alan Celine's soul in a canari. Alan is then buried alive with a tarantula to "keep him company." Waking up in his coffin a few hours later, Alan is rescued by Christophe, who was also turned into a zombie by Peytraud.

Having escaped Peytraud's trap, Alan returns to the Tonton Macoute headquarters looking for Marielle. There, Alan defeats Peytraud through a battle of wills, using Celine's white magic to drive a nail into Peytraud's groin, and sends his soul to hell. As the Haitian people celebrate the downfall of Jean-Claude Duvalier, Marielle proclaims, "The nightmare is over."

== Cast ==
- Bill Pullman as Dr. Dennis Alan
- Cathy Tyson as Dr. Marielle Duchamp
- Zakes Mokae as Dargent Peytraud
- Paul Winfield as Lucien Celine
- Brent Jennings as Louis Mozart
- Conrad Roberts as Christophe Durand
- Aleta Mitchell as Celestine Durand
- Badja Djola as Lieutenant Gaston
- Michael Gough as Dr. Earl "Schoonie" Schoonbacher
- Paul Guilfoyle as Dr. Andrew Cassedy
- Dey Young as Deborah Cassedy
- Luis Tavare Pesquera as Kyle Cassedy
- William Newman as French Missionary Doctor
- Francis Guinan as American Doctor
- Jaime Pina Gautier as Julio, Dennis' Helicopter Pilot
- Philogen Thomas as Priest
- Evencio Mosquera Slaco as Old Shaman

== Production ==
Producer Rob Cohen brought the project to Wes Craven who loved the project as he felt it was the perfect crossover piece to use his reputation as a horror director to reach a more adult audience. Wade Davis, who wrote the titular book which served as the basis for the film, served as a technical advisor during shooting. Producer Rob Cohen said that active Vodou priests also served as advisers during filming in Haiti and the Dominican Republic, and that their cooperation was considered essential to completing the production. Despite being marketed as a horror film, Craven himself saw the movie as a mixture of political drama and romance infused with an exploration of the Voodoo religion that was mostly unknown to traditional horror audiences.

The Serpent and the Rainbow was filmed in Boston, Massachusetts, Santo Domingo in the Dominican Republic, and in Haiti. During filming in Haiti, production was disrupted by a confrontation involving approximately 2,000 local extras who demanded higher wages. Director Wes Craven recalled fearing for the crew's safety as the dispute escalated, prompting the filmmakers to evacuate and relocate production to the neighbouring Dominican Republic.

Craven and his crew faced challenges from the shooting on location in Haiti including multiple bouts of illness from contaminated food and water, sewage leakage in local slums and cemeteries in which scenes were filmed, and the necessity of enlisting a local militia for protection. According to Craven, several villages worth of Haitians sought the crew out to work as extras on the film.

== Release ==
=== Rating ===
In an interview, Craven stated that unlike his previous films that had problems with the Motion Picture Association of America, the first cut got an R rating without any problems. An early cut of The Serpent and the Rainbow reportedly ran approximately three hours before being shortened to 98 minutes. The film subsequently underwent extensive revisions following three poorly received preview screenings. With support from Universal Pictures, the filmmakers substantially re-edited the film, changed its ending, replaced its musical score and added narration. A fourth preview screening received an 83% positive audience response, compared with 52% for the initial version.

=== Box office ===
The Serpent and the Rainbow was released theatrically in the United States by Universal Pictures on February 5, 1988. It grossed $19,595,031 at the box office.

=== Critical reception ===
On review aggregator Rotten Tomatoes, The Serpent and the Rainbow holds an approval rating of 62%, based on 37 reviews, and an average rating of 5.7/10. Its consensus reads, "Although it's occasionally overwhelmed by excessive special effects, The Serpent and the Rainbow draws on a chilling atmosphere to deliver [an] intelligent, politically informed story." On Metacritic, the film has a weighted average score of 64 out of 100, based on 13 critics, indicating "generally favorable reviews".

Roger Ebert of the Chicago Sun-Times gave the movie three stars out of a possible four, praising Pullman's performance and the "stunning" visuals, while also noting The Serpent and the Rainbow seemed to take Haitian voodoo more seriously as a religion and cultural force than most horror movies with similar themes, which merely use voodoo as a "gimmick".

=== Home media ===
The film was released on DVD by Image Entertainment in 1998, followed by a re-release from Universal Studios Home Video in 2003. On 4 May 2015, Fabulous Films released the film on Blu-ray in the United Kingdom. Scream Factory subsequently released a Collector's Edition Blu-ray in the United States on 23 February 2016, featuring a new high-definition transfer, audio commentary by Bill Pullman and interviews with members of the production team.

In April 2024, Australian distributor Via Vision Entertainment included the film in a limited-edition Wes Craven Film Collection, alongside Deadly Blessing (1981) and The People Under the Stairs (1991). The release featured a new audio commentary by film scholar Alexandra Heller-Nicholas. Fabulous Films re-released the film on Blu-ray in the United Kingdom on 3 March 2025, accompanied by a double-sided poster featuring artwork by Rich Davies.

== Legacy ==
The Serpent and the Rainbow has been retrospectively recognised for its treatment of Haitian zombie folklore. In 2019, Martyn Conterio of the British Film Institute included it among ten essential films by Wes Craven, praising its exploration of Haiti's political history and its parallels between the traditional zombie figure and a nation subjected to colonialism and dictatorship. The BFI subsequently identified the film as a rare example of the traditional Haitian zombie in post-1960s horror cinema, contrasting its approach with the flesh-eating undead popularised by George A. Romero.

The film has also attracted academic analysis of its political and cultural themes. In a 2015 study published in Contemporary French and Francophone Studies, Christopher Garland examined The Serpent and the Rainbow alongside White Zombie (1932), exploring how both films could be interpreted as allegories of Haiti's history and its relationship with the United States. In 2024, Le Monde discussed the film as part of a return to the Haitian origins of zombie mythology, alongside Bertrand Bonello's Zombi Child (2019).

The film's representation of Haitian culture has also attracted criticism. In a 2026 discussion of the documentary Black Zombie, Soraya Nadia McDonald of The Guardian identified Craven's adaptation as an example of Hollywood's sensationalised treatment of Haitian Vodou and zombie traditions.

== See also ==
- List of films featuring hallucinogens
