= Tetrodotoxin =

Neurotoxin

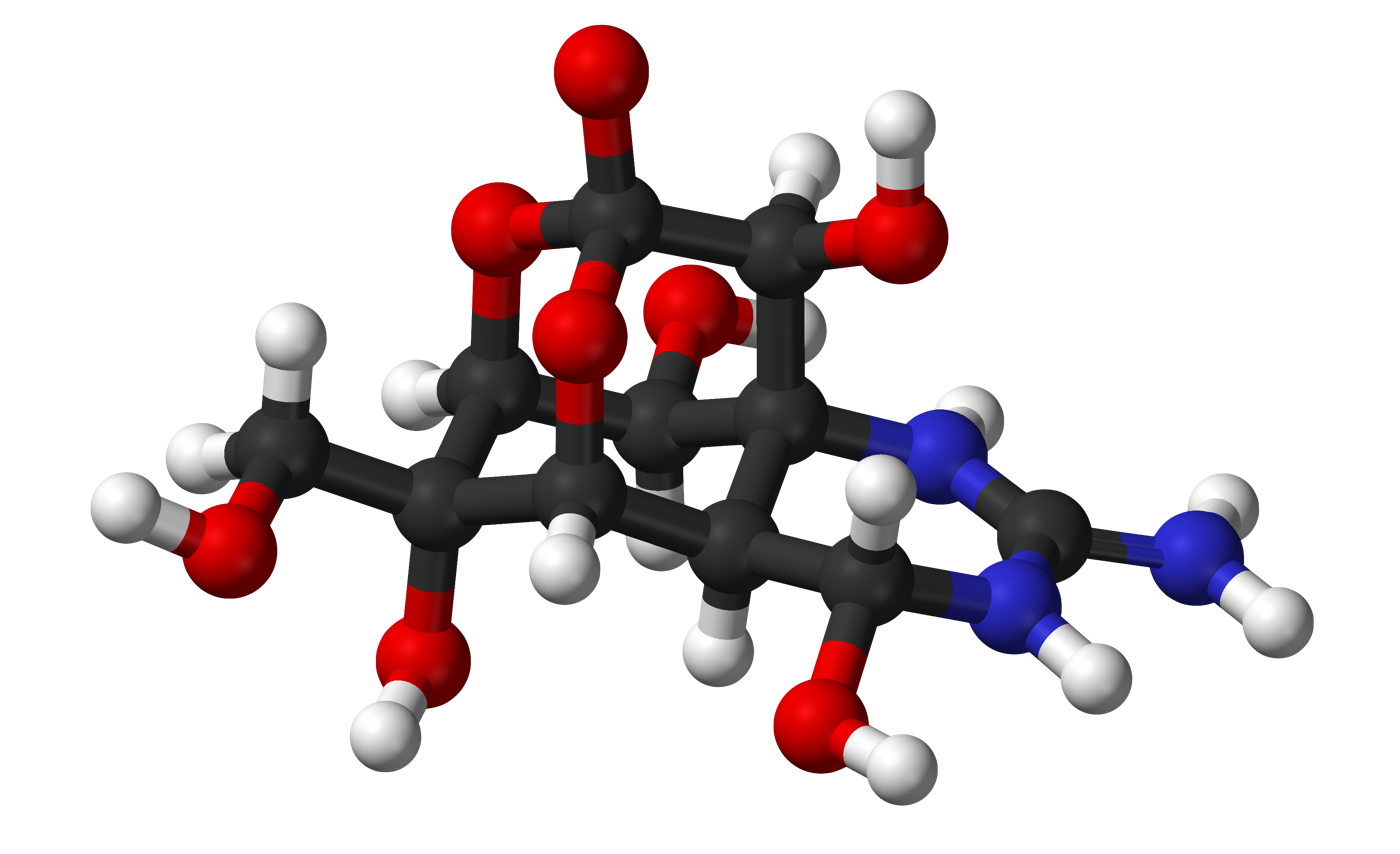

Names
- IUPAC name (4R,4aR,5R,6S,7S,8S,8aR,10S,12S)-2-azaniumylidene-4,6,8,12-tetrahydroxy-6-(hydroxymethyl)-2,3,4,4a,5,6,7,8-octahydro-1H-8a,10-methano-5,7-(epoxymethanooxy)quinazolin-10-olate
- Other names anhydrotetrodotoxin, 4-epitetrodotoxin, tetrodonic acid, TTX

Identifiers
CAS Number	4368-28-9
3D model (JSmol)	Interactive image; zwitterion: Interactive image
ChEBI	CHEBI:9506
ChEMBL	ChEMBL507974
ChemSpider	9349691
ECHA InfoCard	100.022.236
IUPHAR/BPS	2616
KEGG	C11692
PubChem CID	11174599
UNII	3KUM2721U9
CompTox Dashboard (EPA)	DTXSID10881342
- InChI: InChI=1S/C11H17N3O8/c12-8-13-6(17)2-4-9(19,1-15)5-3(16)10(2,14-8)7(18)11(20,21-4)22-5/h2-7,15-20H,1H2,(H3,12,13,14)/t2-,3-,4-,5+,6-,7+,9+,10-,11+/m1/s1 Key: CFMYXEVWODSLAX-QOZOJKKESA-N; InChI=1/C11H17N3O8/c12-8-13-6(17)2-4-9(19,1-15)5-3(16)10(2,14-8)7(18)11(20,21-4)22-5/h2-7,15-20H,1H2,(H3,12,13,14)/t2-,3-,4-,5+,6-,7+,9+,10-,11+/m1/s1 Key: CFMYXEVWODSLAX-QOZOJKKEBM
- SMILES: O1[C@@H]4[C@@](O)([C@@H]3O[C@@]1(O)[C@@H](O)[C@]2(N\C(N/[C@H](O)[C@H]23)=N)[C@@H]4O)CO; zwitterion: O1[C@@H]4[C@@](O)([C@@H]3O[C@@]1([O-])[C@@H](O)[C@]2(N\C(N/[C@H](O)[C@H]23)=[NH2+])[C@@H]4O)CO

Properties
Chemical formula	C_{11}H_{17}N_{3}O_{8}
Molar mass	319.270 g·mol^{−1}

Hazards
- GHS labelling
Pictograms	(GHS06: Toxic)
Signal word	Danger
Hazard statements	H300, H310, H330
Precautionary statements	P260, P262, P264, P270, P271, P280, P284, P301+P316, P302+P352, P304+P340, P316, P320, P321, P330, P361+P364, P403+P233, P405, P501
- Except where otherwise noted, data are given for materials in their standard state (at 25 °C [77 °F], 100 kPa). verify (what is ?) Infobox references

Tetrodotoxin (TTX) is a potent neurotoxin. Its name derives from Tetraodontiformes, an order that includes pufferfish, porcupinefish, ocean sunfish, and triggerfish; several of these species carry the toxin. Although tetrodotoxin was discovered in these fish, it is found in several other animals (e.g., in blue-ringed octopuses, rough-skinned newts, and moon snails). It is also produced by certain infectious or symbiotic bacteria like Pseudoalteromonas, Pseudomonas, and Vibrio as well as other species found in symbiotic relationships with animals and plants.

Although it produces thousands of intoxications annually and several deaths, it has shown efficacy for the treatment of cancer-related pain in phase II and III clinical trials.

Tetrodotoxin is a sodium channel blocker. It inhibits the firing of action potentials in neurons by binding to the voltage-gated sodium channels in nerve cell membranes and blocking the passage of sodium ions (responsible for the rising phase of an action potential) into the neuron. This prevents the nervous system from carrying messages and thus muscles from contracting in response to nervous stimulation.

Its mechanism of action – selective blocking of the sodium channel – was shown definitively in 1964 by Toshio Narahashi and John W. Moore at Duke University, using the sucrose gap voltage clamp technique.

== Sources in nature ==
Apart from their bacterial species of most likely ultimate biosynthetic origin (see below), tetrodotoxin has been isolated from widely differing animal species, including:

- all octopuses and cuttlefish in small amounts, but specifically several species of the blue-ringed octopus, including Hapalochlaena maculosa (where it was called "maculotoxin"),
- various pufferfish species,
- certain angelfish,
- species of Nassarius gastropods,
- species of Naticidae (moon snails),
- several starfish, including Astropecten species,
- several species of xanthid crabs.
- the mangrove horseshoe crab (Carcinoscorpius rotundicauda)
- species of Chaetognatha (arrow worms),
- species of Nemertea (ribbon worms),
- a polyclad flatworm,
- land planarians of the genus Bipalium,
- toads of the genus Atelopus,
- toads of the genus Brachycephalus,
- the eastern newt (Notophthalmus viridescens)
- the western or rough-skinned newts (Taricha; wherein it was originally termed "tarichatoxin"),

Tarichatoxin was shown to be identical to TTX in 1964 by Mosher et al., and the identity of maculotoxin and TTX was reported in Science in 1978, and the synonymity of these two toxins is supported in modern reports (e.g., at Pubchem and in modern toxicology textbooks) though historic monographs questioning this continue in reprint.

The toxin is variously used by animals as a defensive biotoxin to ward off predation, or as both a defensive and predatory venom (e.g., in octopuses, chaetognaths, and ribbon worms). Even though the toxin acts as a defense mechanism, some predators such as the common garter snake have developed insensitivity to TTX, which allows them to prey upon toxic newts.

The association of TTX with consumed, infecting, or symbiotic bacterial populations within the animal species from which it is isolated is relatively clear; presence of TTX-producing bacteria within an animal's microbiome is determined by culture methods, the presence of the toxin by chemical analysis, and the association of the bacteria with TTX production by toxicity assay of media in which suspected bacteria are grown. As Lago et al. note, "there is good evidence that uptake of bacteria producing TTX is an important element of TTX toxicity in marine animals that present this toxin." TTX-producing bacteria include Actinomyces, Aeromonas, Alteromonas, Bacillus, Pseudomonas, and Vibrio species; in the following animals, specific bacterial species have been implicated: (Note: For a more comprehensive list of TTX-producing bacterial species associated with animals from which the toxin has been isolated or toxicity observed, and for a thorough discussion of the research literature regarding bacterial origins (and the remaining contrary perspectives, e.g., in newts), as well as for a thorough speculative discussion regarding biosynthesis, see)

Association of animals with TTX-producing bacteria
Animal	Bacteria	Ref
Takifugu obscurus, obscure pufferfish	Aeromonas sp. Ne-1; Bacillus sp. W-3	
Nassarius semiplicatus, a gastropod	Vibrio spp., including V. alginolyticus, V. cf. shilonii, and unassigned ones; Marinomonas sp.; Tenacibaculum cf. aestuarii	
Hapalochlaena maculosa, the Southern blue-ringed octopus	Alteromonas spp.; Bacillus spp.; Pseudomonas spp.; Vibrio spp.	
Astropecten polyacanthus, a starfish	Vibrio alginolyticus	
Takifugu vermicularis, a pufferfish	Vibrio spp., including V. alginolyticus	
Four species of Chaetognatha (arrow worms)	V. alginolyticus	
Species of Nemertea (ribbon worms)	Vibrio spp.	

The association of bacterial species with the production of the toxin is unequivocal – Lago and coworkers state, "[e]ndocellular symbiotic bacteria have been proposed as a possible source of eukaryotic TTX by means of an exogenous pathway", and Chau and coworkers note that the "widespread occurrence of TTX in phylogenetically distinct organisms... strongly suggests that symbiotic bacteria play a role in TTX biosynthesis" – although the correlation has been extended to most but not all animals in which the toxin has been identified. To the contrary, there has been a failure in a single case, that of newts (Taricha granulosa), to detect TTX-producing bacteria in the tissues with highest toxin levels (skin, ovaries, muscle), using PCR methods, although technical concerns about the approach have been raised. Critically for the general argument, Takifugu rubripes puffers captured and raised in laboratory on controlled, TTX-free diets "lose toxicity over time", while cultured, TTX-free Takifugu niphobles puffers fed on TTX-containing diets saw TTX in the livers of the fishes increase to toxic levels. Hence, as bacterial species that produce TTX are broadly present in aquatic sediments, a strong case is made for ingestion of TTX and/or TTX-producing bacteria, with accumulation and possible subsequent colonization and production. Nevertheless, without clear biosynthetic pathways (not yet found in animals, but shown for bacteria), it remains uncertain whether it is simply via bacteria that each animal accumulates TTX; the question remains as to whether the quantities can be sufficiently explained by ingestion, ingestion plus colonization, or some other mechanism.

== Biochemistry ==
Tetrodotoxin binds to what is known as site 1 of the fast voltage-gated sodium channel. Site 1 is located at the extracellular pore opening of the ion channel. Any molecule bound to this site will block sodium ions from going into the nerve cell through this channel (which is ultimately necessary for nerve conduction). Saxitoxin, neosaxitoxin, and several of the conotoxins also bind the same site.

The use of this toxin as a biochemical probe has elucidated two distinct types of voltage-gated sodium channels (VGSCs) present in mammals: tetrodotoxin-sensitive voltage-gated sodium channels (TTX-s Na^{+} channels) and tetrodotoxin-resistant voltage-gated sodium channels (TTX-r Na^{+} channels). Tetrodotoxin inhibits TTX-s Na^{+} channels at concentrations of around 1–10 nM, whereas micromolar concentrations of tetrodotoxin are required to inhibit TTX-r Na^{+} channels. Nerve cells containing TTX-r Na^{+} channels are located primarily in cardiac tissue, while nerve cells containing TTX-s Na^{+} channels dominate the rest of the body.

TTX and its analogs have historically been important agents for use as chemical tool compounds, for use in channel characterization and in fundamental studies of channel function. The prevalence of TTX-s Na^{+} channels in the central nervous system makes tetrodotoxin a valuable agent for the silencing of neural activity within a cell culture.

=== Biosynthesis ===
The biosynthetic route to TTX is only partially understood. It is long known that the molecule is related to saxitoxin, and as of 2011 it is believed that there are separate routes for aquatic (bacterial) and terrestrial (newt) TTX. In 2020, new intermediates found in newts suggest that the synthesis starts with geranyl guanidine in the amphibian; these intermediates were not found in aquatic TTX-containing animals, supporting the separate-route theory. In 2021, the first genome of a TTX-producing bacterium was produced. This "Bacillus sp. 1839" was identified as Cytobacillus gottheilii using its rRNA sequence. The researcher responsible for this study has not yet identified a coherent pathway but hopes to do so in the future.

=== Resistance ===
Animals that accumulate TTX as a defense mechanism as well as their predators must evolve to be resistant to the effects of TTX. Mutations in the VGSC genes, especially the genes for Na_{v} 1.4 (skeletal muscle VGSC, "TTX-s"), are found in many such animals. These mutations have independently arisen several times, even multiple times in different populations of the same species as seen in the garter snake. They consist of different amino acid substitutions in similar positions, a weak example of convergent evolution caused by how TTX binds to the unmutated VGSC.

Another path to TTX resistance is toxin-binding proteins that hold onto TTX tightly enough to prevent it reaching the vulnerable VGSCs. Various proteins that bind TTX have been found in pufferfish, crabs, and gastropods. There are also proteins that bind saxitoxin (STX), a toxin with a similar mode of action.

== Chemical synthesis ==
In 1964, a team of scientists led by Robert B. Woodward elucidated the structure of tetrodotoxin. The structure was confirmed by X-ray crystallography in 1970. Yoshito Kishi and coworkers reported the first total synthesis of racemic tetrodotoxin in 1972. M. Isobe and coworkers and J. Du Bois reported the asymmetric total synthesis of tetrodotoxin in 2003. The two 2003 syntheses used very different strategies, with Isobe's route based on a Diels-Alder approach and Du Bois's work using C–H bond activation. Since then, methods have rapidly advanced, with several new strategies for the synthesis of tetrodotoxin having been developed.

== Poisoning ==
=== Toxicity ===
TTX is extremely toxic. The material safety data sheet for TTX lists the oral median lethal dose (LD_{50}) for mice as 334 μg per kg. For comparison, the oral LD_{50} of potassium cyanide for mice is 8,500 μg per kg, demonstrating that even orally, TTX is more poisonous than cyanide. TTX is even more dangerous if administered intravenously; the amount needed to reach a lethal dose by injection is 8 μg per kg in mice.

The toxin can enter the body of a victim by ingestion, injection, or inhalation, or through abraded skin.

Poisoning occurring as a consequence of consumption of fish from the order Tetraodontiformes is extremely serious. The organs (e.g., liver) of the pufferfish can contain levels of tetrodotoxin sufficient to produce the described paralysis of the diaphragm and corresponding death due to respiratory failure. Toxicity varies between species and at different seasons and geographic localities, and the flesh of many pufferfish may not be dangerously toxic.

The mechanism of toxicity is through the blockage of fast voltage-gated sodium channels, which are required for the normal transmission of signals between the body and brain. As a result, TTX causes loss of sensation, and paralysis of muscles including the diaphragm and intercostal muscles, stopping breathing.

=== History ===
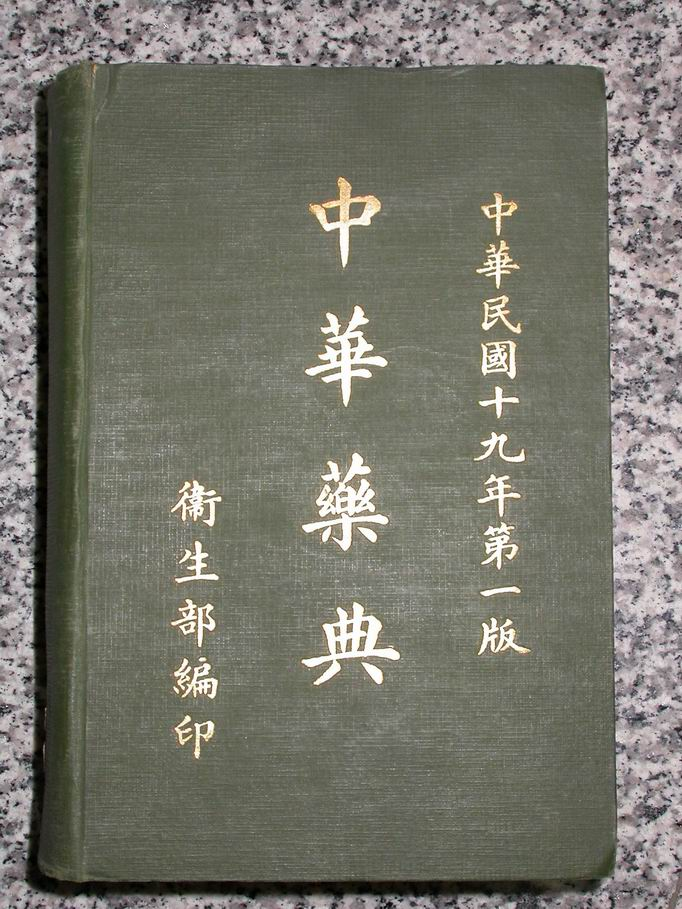
A Chinese pharmacopoeia, 1930.

The therapeutic uses of puffer fish (tetraodon) eggs were mentioned in the first Chinese pharmacopoeia Pen-T'so Ching (The Book of Herbs, allegedly 2838–2698 BC by Shennong; but a later date is more likely), where they were classified as having "medium" toxicity, but could have a tonic effect when used at the correct dose. The principal use was "to arrest convulsive diseases". In the Pen-T'so Kang Mu (Index Herbacea or The Great Herbal by Li Shih-Chen, 1596) some types of the fish Ho-Tun (the current Chinese name for tetraodon) were also recognized as both toxic yet, at the right dose, useful as part of a tonic. Increased toxicity in Ho-Tun was noted in fish caught at sea (rather than river) after the month of March. It was recognized that the most poisonous parts were the liver and eggs, but that toxicity could be reduced by soaking the eggs. (Tetrodotoxin is slightly water-soluble, and soluble at 1 mg/ml in slightly acidic solutions.)

The German physician Engelbert Kaempfer, in his "A History of Japan" (translated and published in English in 1727), described how well known the toxic effects of the fish were, to the extent that it would be used for suicide and that the Emperor specifically decreed that soldiers were not permitted to eat it. There is also evidence from other sources that knowledge of such toxicity was widespread throughout southeast Asia and India.

The first recorded cases of TTX poisoning affecting Westerners are from the logs of Captain James Cook from 7 September 1774. The crew received a fish from the New Caledonia natives. According to Fuhrman, the ship naturalists J. R. Forster and Georg Forster spent so much time drawing and describing the fish that only the roe and liver were cooked. The three men experienced numbness and weakness in their limbs, only surviving the incident due to the small amount they ingested.

The toxin was first isolated and named in 1909 by Japanese scientist Dr. Yoshizumi Tahara. It was one of the agents studied by Japan's Unit 731, which evaluated biological weapons on human subjects in the 1930s.

=== Symptoms and treatment ===
The diagnosis of pufferfish poisoning is based on the observed symptomatology and recent dietary history.

Symptoms typically develop within 30 minutes of ingestion, but may be delayed by up to four hours; however, if the dose is fatal, symptoms are usually present within 17 minutes of ingestion. Having pins and needles of the lips and tongue is followed by developing it in the extremities, hypersalivation, sweating, headache, weakness, lethargy, incoordination, tremor, paralysis, bluish skin, loss of voice, difficulty swallowing, and seizures. The gastrointestinal symptoms are often severe and include nausea, vomiting, diarrhoea, and abdominal pain; death is usually secondary to respiratory failure. There is increasing respiratory distress, speech is affected, and the victim usually exhibits shortness of breath, excess pupil dilation, and abnormally low blood pressure. Paralysis increases, and convulsions, mental impairment, and irregular heartbeats may occur. The victim, although completely paralysed, may be conscious and in some cases completely lucid until shortly before death, which generally occurs within 4 to 6 hours (range ~20 minutes to ~8 hours). However, some victims enter a coma.

About 3 or 4 o'clock in the morning we were seized with an extraordinary weakness in all our limbs attended with a numbness or sensation like to that caused by exposeing [sic] ones hands or feet to a fire after having been pinched by frost. I had almost lost the sence [sic] of feeling nor could I distinguish between light and heavy bodies, a quart pot full of water and a feather was the same in my hand.

— James Cook

If the patient survives 24 hours, recovery without any after effects will usually occur over a few days.

Therapy is supportive and based on symptoms, with aggressive early airway management. If consumed, treatment can consist of emptying the stomach, feeding the victim activated charcoal to bind the toxin, and taking standard life-support measures to keep the victim alive until the effect of the poison has worn off. Alpha adrenergic agonists are recommended in addition to intravenous fluids to increase the blood pressure; anticholinesterase agents "have been proposed as a treatment option but have not been tested adequately".

No antidote has been developed and approved for human use, but a primary research report (preliminary result) indicates that a monoclonal antibody specific to tetrodotoxin is in development by USAMRIID that was effective, in the one study, for reducing toxin lethality in tests on mice.

=== Worldwide distribution of toxicity ===
Poisonings from tetrodotoxin have been almost exclusively associated with the consumption of pufferfish from waters of the Indo-Pacific Ocean regions, primarily because equally toxic pufferfishes from other regions are much less commonly eaten. Several reported cases of poisonings, including fatalities, nonetheless involved pufferfish from the Atlantic Ocean, Gulf of Mexico, and Gulf of California. There have been no confirmed cases of tetrodotoxicity from the Atlantic pufferfish, Sphoeroides maculatus, but three studies found extracts from fish of this species highly toxic in mice. Several recent intoxications from these fishes in Florida were due to saxitoxin, which causes paralytic shellfish poisoning with very similar symptoms and signs. The trumpet shell Charonia sauliae has been implicated in food poisonings, and evidence suggests it contains a tetrodotoxin derivative. There have been several reported poisonings from mislabelled pufferfish, and at least one report of a fatal episode in Oregon when an individual swallowed a rough-skinned newt Taricha granulosa on a dare.

In 2009, a major scare in the Auckland Region of New Zealand was sparked after several dogs died eating Pleurobranchaea maculata (grey side-gilled seaslug) on beaches. Children and pet owners were asked to avoid beaches, and recreational fishing was also interrupted for a time. After exhaustive analysis, it was found that the sea slugs must have ingested tetrodotoxin.

==== Statistical factors ====
Statistics from the Tokyo Bureau of Social Welfare and Public Health indicate 20–44 incidents of fugu poisoning per year between 1996 and 2006 in the entire country, leading to 34–64 hospitalizations and 0–6 deaths per year, for an average fatality rate of 6.8%. Of the 23 incidents recorded within Tokyo between 1993 and 2006, only one took place in a restaurant, while the others all involved fishermen eating their catch. From 2006 through 2009 in Japan there were 119 incidents involving 183 people but only seven people died.

Only a few cases have been reported in the United States, and outbreaks in countries outside the Indo-Pacific area are rare. In Haiti, tetrodotoxin was thought to have been used in voodoo preparations, in so-called zombie poisons. Subsequent careful analysis has however repeatedly called early studies into question on technical grounds, and failed to identify the toxin in any preparation. Discussion of the matter has therefore all but disappeared from the primary literature since the early 1990s. Kao and Yasumoto concluded in the first of their papers in 1986 that "the widely circulated claim in the lay press to the effect that tetrodotoxin is the causal agent in the initial zombification process is without factual foundation."

Genetic background is not a factor in susceptibility to tetrodotoxin poisoning. This toxicosis may be avoided by not consuming animal species known to contain tetrodotoxin, principally pufferfish; other tetrodotoxic species are not usually consumed by humans.

==== Fugu as a food ====
Poisoning from tetrodotoxin is of particular public health concern in Japan, where fugu is a traditional delicacy. It is prepared and sold in special restaurants where trained and licensed chefs carefully remove the viscera to reduce the danger of poisoning. There is potential for misidentification and mislabelling, particularly of prepared, frozen fish products.

=== Food analysis ===
The mouse bioassay developed for paralytic shellfish poisoning (PSP) can be used to monitor tetrodotoxin in pufferfish and is the current method of choice. An HPLC method with post-column reaction with alkali and fluorescence has been developed to determine tetrodotoxin and its associated toxins. The alkali degradation products can be confirmed as their trimethylsilyl derivatives by gas chromatography/mass spectrometry.

=== Detection in body fluids ===
Tetrodotoxin may be quantified in serum, whole blood or urine to confirm a diagnosis of poisoning in hospitalized patients or to assist in the forensic investigation of a case of fatal overdosage. Most analytical techniques involve mass spectrometric detection following gas or liquid chromatographic separation.

== Modern therapeutic research ==
Tetrodotoxin has been investigated as a possible treatment for cancer-associated pain. Early clinical trials demonstrate significant pain relief in some patients.

It has also been studied in relation to migraine headaches. Mutations in one particular TTX-sensitive Na^{+} channel are associated with some migraine headaches, although it is unclear as to whether this has any therapeutic relevance for most people with migraine.

Tetrodotoxin has been used clinically to relieve negative affects associated with heroin withdrawal.

== Regulation ==
In the U.S., tetrodotoxin appears on the select agents list of the Department of Health and Human Services, and scientists must register with HHS to use tetrodotoxin in their research. However, investigators possessing less than 500 mg are exempt from regulation.

== Popular culture ==
Tetrodotoxin serves as a plot device for characters to fake death, as in the films Hello Again (1987), The Serpent and the Rainbow (1988), The A-Team (2010), Captain America: The Winter Soldier (2014), and War (2019), and in episodes of Jane the Virgin, Miami Vice (1985), Nikita, MacGyver (season 7, episode 6, where the antidote is Datura stramonium leaf), CSI: NY (season 4, episode 9, "Boo"), and Chuck. In Law Abiding Citizen (2009), Alex Cross (2012), and Send Help (2026), paralysis is presented as a method of assisting torture. The toxin was also referenced in "synthetic form" in season 1, episode 2, of the series "FBI". The toxin is used as a weapon in both the second season of Archer, in Covert Affairs and in the Inside No. 9 episode "The Riddle of the Sphinx". In Columbo, episode 2 of season 7, fugu is used to kill the antagonist's victim. In The Apothecary Diaries light novel, as well as the respective manga and anime adaptations, fugu toxin is encountered across multiple mystery arcs.

Based on the presumption that tetrodotoxin is not always fatal, but at near-lethal doses can leave a person extremely unwell with the person remaining conscious, tetrodotoxin has been alleged to result in zombieism, and has been suggested as an ingredient in Haitian Vodou preparations. This idea first appeared in the 1938 non-fiction book Tell My Horse by Zora Neale Hurston in which there were multiple accounts of purported tetrodotoxin poisoning in Haiti by a voodoo sorcerer called the bokor. These stories were later popularized by Harvard-trained ethnobotanist Wade Davis in his 1985 book and Wes Craven's 1988 film, both titled The Serpent and the Rainbow. James Ellroy includes "blowfish toxin" as an ingredient in Haitian Vodou preparations to produce zombieism and poisoning deaths in his 2009 novel Blood's a Rover. However, this theory has been questioned by the scientific community since the 1990s based on analytical chemistry-based tests of multiple preparations and review of earlier reports (see above).

== See also ==
- Aconitine, a sodium channel opener
- Clairvius Narcisse, Haitian man allegedly buried alive under the effect of TTX
- Tetrodocain, North Korean medical injection derived from tetrodotoxin
- 4-Aminopyridine
- Brevetoxin
- Ciguatoxin
- Conotoxin
- Domoic acid
- Neosaxitoxin
- Neurotoxin
- Okadaic acid
- Saxitoxin
- Tectin
