= Bokor =

Vodou priest or priestess

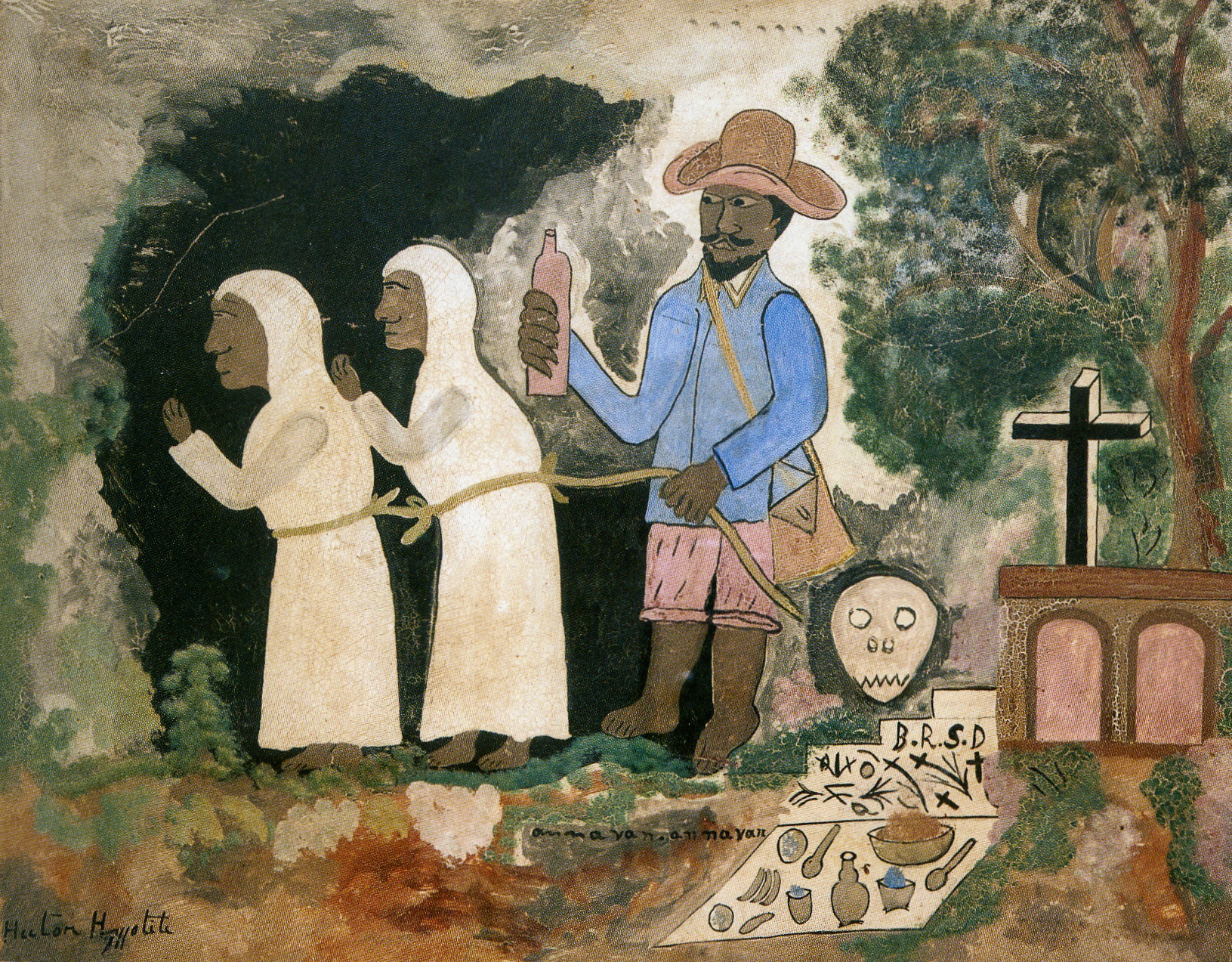
1946 painting by Haitian artist Hector Hyppolite, of a bokor (with icons of Baron Samedi), engaged in body snatching from a cemetery in order to create zombies to serve him.

A bokor (male) (Haitian Creole: bòkò) or caplata (female) is a Vodou priest or priestess for hire in Haiti who is said to serve the loa, "'with both hands', practicing for both good and evil." Their practice includes the creation of zombies and of ouangas (talismans that house spirits).

== Term ==
The term bokor can also refer to the leader of the Makaya division of Vodou, which originated in the Congo region. It is believed that there is a grand master for all bokors that have ever lived who can be reborn in every century. During the dictatorship of Papa Doc Duvalier (as Haiti's President for life) in the 1960s, he is known of creating the army of the undead. Duvalier's second in command, Luckner Cambronne, the head of the secret police, the Tonton Macoute and a high-ranking political figure was known as the Vampire of the Caribbean for developing a reputation for enforcement and cruelty by selling Haitian blood and cadavers to the United States. He was expelled from Haiti by the dictator Baby Doc Duvalier and moved to Florida from 1972 until his death in 2006, and was replaced by Roger Lafontant as leader of the Tonton Macoutes.

== Description ==
Bokors, featured in many Haitian tales, are often associated with the creation of zombies by the use of a deadening brew or potion, usually containing poison extracted from puffer fish (tetrodotoxin). This potion induces the drinker to appear as though they were dead; thus they are often buried. Later, the bokor would return for the victim and force them to do his bidding, such as manual labor. The victim is often given deliriant drugs, mainly Datura stramonium, where they enter a detached, somewhat dreamlike state. Its state is likened to being mind controlled. The person is alive but in a state where they cannot control what they say or do; at this point, when the person has been reanimated from the grave, or at least is moving about working for the bokor, they can be termed zombies. However, some legends dispense with this explanation, and have the bokor raise zombies from dead bodies whose souls have departed.

Also, bokors are said to work with zombie astrals – souls or spirits which are captured in a fetish and made to enhance the bokor's power. Bokors normally work with the Loas Baron Samedi, Kalfu, Legba and Simbi (snake loa), and in some cases they are said to work with Grand Bois, the loa of the forest.

Bokors are similar to the rootworkers of Vodou and Louisiana Voodoo. Some may be priests of a Vodou house. Bokor are usually chosen from birth, those who are believed to bear a great ashe (power). A bokor can be, by worldly terms, good or evil, though some sources consider them an evil version of a houngan.

== See also ==
- Abakuá, an Afro-Cuban religion whose name possibly shares the same etymology
- Clairvius Narcisse, a Haitian alleged to have been kept in a zombie-like state by a bokor
