= Tim Burton filmography =

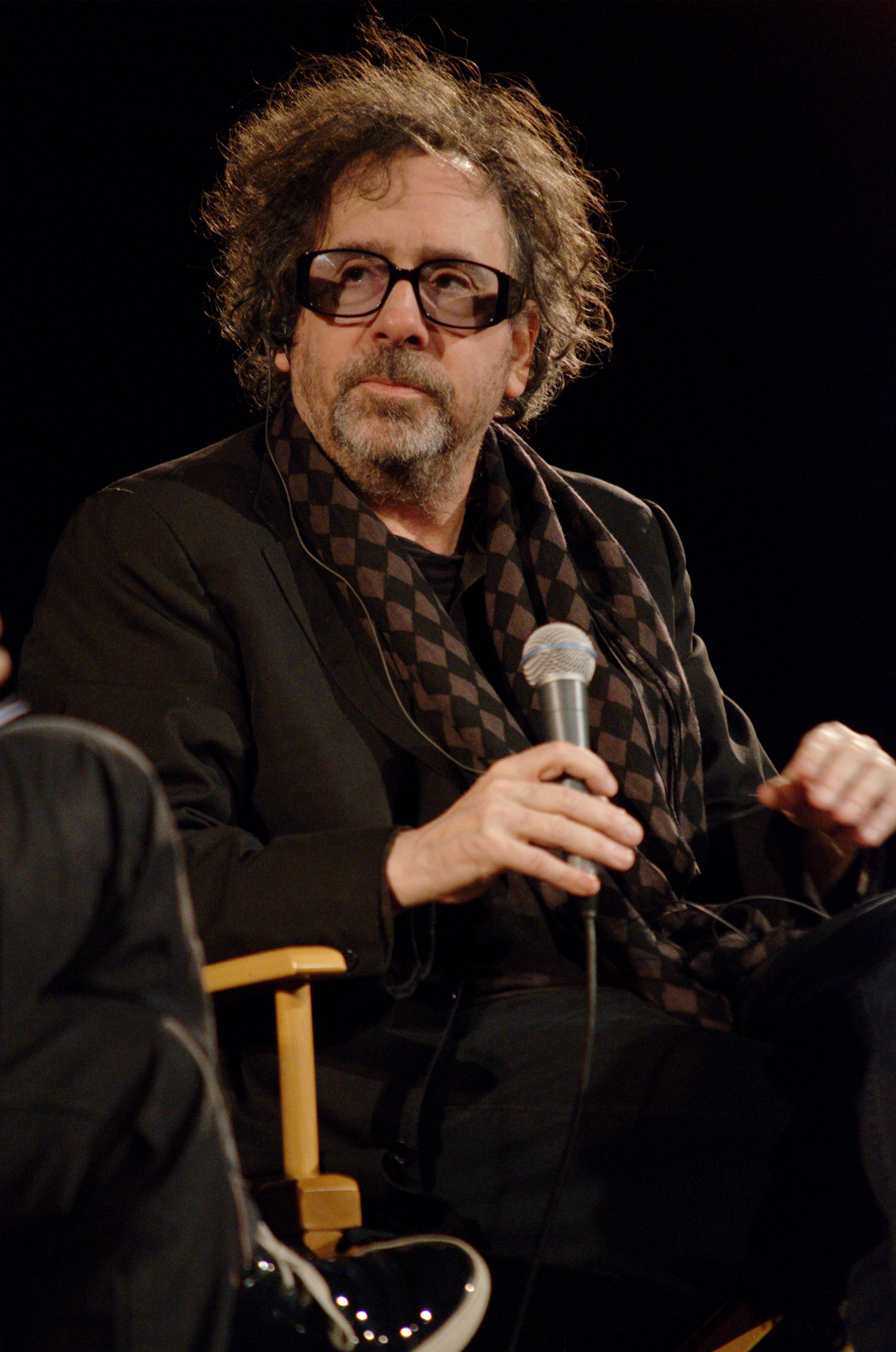
Burton in 2012

Tim Burton (born August 25, 1958) is an American film director, producer, artist, writer, animator, puppeteer, and actor.

He is known for his gothic horror and fantasy films, such as Beetlejuice (1988), Edward Scissorhands (1990), Ed Wood (1994), Sleepy Hollow (1999), Corpse Bride (2005), Sweeney Todd: The Demon Barber of Fleet Street (2007), Dark Shadows (2012), Frankenweenie (2012), and Beetlejuice Beetlejuice (2024).

He is also known for blockbuster films, such as the adventure-comedy Pee-wee's Big Adventure (1985), the comic book films Batman (1989), and Batman Returns (1992), the science fiction films Mars Attacks! (1996), and Planet of the Apes (2001), the fantasy-drama Big Fish (2003), the musical adventure film Charlie and the Chocolate Factory (2005), the fantasy film Alice in Wonderland (2010), and film adaptations of Miss Peregrine's Home for Peculiar Children (2016), and Dumbo (2019).

== Feature film ==
Year	Title	Director	Story	Producer	Note	Ref(s)
1985	Pee-wee's Big Adventure	Yes	No	No		
1988	Beetlejuice	Yes	No	No		
1989	Batman	Yes	No	No		
1990	Edward Scissorhands	Yes	Yes	Yes		
1992	Batman Returns	Yes	No	Yes		
1993	The Nightmare Before Christmas	No	Based on	Yes		
1994	Ed Wood	Yes	No	Yes		
1996	Mars Attacks!	Yes	No	Yes		
1999	Sleepy Hollow	Yes	No	No		
2001	Planet of the Apes	Yes	No	No		
2003	Big Fish	Yes	No	No		
2005	Charlie and the Chocolate Factory	Yes	No	No		
2005	Corpse Bride	Yes	Characters	Yes	Co-directed with Mike Johnson	
2007	Sweeney Todd: The Demon Barber of Fleet Street	Yes	No	No		
2010	Alice in Wonderland	Yes	No	No		
2012	Dark Shadows	Yes	No	No		
2012	Frankenweenie	Yes	Yes	Yes		
2014	Big Eyes	Yes	No	Yes		
2016	Miss Peregrine's Home for Peculiar Children	Yes	No	No		
2019	Dumbo	Yes	No	Executive		
2024	Beetlejuice Beetlejuice	Yes	No	Yes		

Producer only

- Cabin Boy (1994)
- Batman Forever (1995)
- James and the Giant Peach (1996)
- 9 (2009)
- Abraham Lincoln: Vampire Hunter (2012)
- Alice Through the Looking Glass (2016)

Acting roles

Year	Title	Role	Notes	Ref(s)
1979	The Muppet Movie	Muppet Performer	Uncredited	
1985	Pee-wee's Big Adventure	Thug in alley	Uncredited	
1992	Singles	Brian		
1992	Hoffa	Corpse	Uncredited	
2012	Men in Black 3	Alien on TV Monitors	Uncredited	
2016	Miss Peregrine's Home for Peculiar Children	Passenger on an Attraction	Uncredited	
2024	Beetlejuice Beetlejuice	Baby Beetlejuice	Uncredited	

Other roles

Year	Title	Role	Ref(s)
1978	The Lord of the Rings	Inbetween artist	
1981	The Fox and the Hound	Animator	
1982	Tron	Animator	
1985	The Black Cauldron	Animator: The Horned King / Conceptual artist	
1992	Stay Tuned	Design consultant	
1996	Mary Reilly	Participant	
2004	Catwoman	Participant	
2009	Waking Sleeping Beauty	Participant	

== Short film ==
Year	Title	Director	Writer	Producer	Notes	Ref(s)
1971	The Island of Doctor Agor	Yes	Yes	No		
1971	Prehistoric Caveman	Yes	No	No		
1971	Houdini: The Untold Story	Yes	No	No		
1972	Tim's Dreams	Yes	No	No		
1974	1997	Yes	No	No		
1979	Doctor of Doom	Yes	Yes	No	With Jerry Rees	
1979	King and Octopus Animation	Yes	No	No		
1979	Stalk of the Celery Monster	Yes	Yes	Yes	Also animator	
1982	Luau	Yes	Yes	Yes	Also animator	
1982	Vincent	Yes	Yes	No	Also production designer	
1984	Frankenweenie	Yes	Story	No	Also storyboard artist	
2013	Captain Sparky vs. The Flying Saucers	No	No	Yes		

Acting roles

Year	Title	Role
1971	The Island of Doctor Agor	Doctor Agor
1971	Houdini: The Untold Story	Houdini
1972	Tim's Dreams	Tim
1979	Doctor of Doom	Don Carlo
1979	Stalk of the Celery Monster	Dr. Maxwell Payne (voice)
1982	Luau	The Supreme Being / Mortie
2012	Vampire's Kiss/Blood Inside	Van Helsing

== Television ==
Year	Title	Director	Executive Producer	Writer	Designer	Notes	Ref(s)
1983	Hansel and Gretel	Yes	No	No	Production	TV special	
1986	Alfred Hitchcock Presents	Yes	No	No	No	Episode: "The Jar"	
1986	Faerie Tale Theatre	Yes	No	No	No	Episode: "Aladdin and His Wonderful Lamp"	
1987	Amazing Stories	No	No	No	Animation	Episode: "The Family Dog"	
1989–1991	Beetlejuice	No	Yes	No	No	Also developer	
1993	Family Dog	No	Yes	No	Consultant		
2000	Lost in Oz	No	Yes	Story	No	Unaired pilot	
2000	Stainboy	Yes	No	Yes	Character	6 web shorts, Also producer	
2022–present	Wednesday	Yes	Yes	No	No	Directed 8 episodes	

Acting roles

Year	Title	Role	Notes
1990	In the Director's Chair: The Man Who Invented Edward Scissorhands	Himself	Mockumentary television film
2025	Wednesday	Parrot (voice)	Episode: "If These Woes Could Talk"

== Other venues ==
Commercials

Year	Title	Subject	Role	Notes	Ref(s)
1998	"Garden Gnome"	Hollywood CG	Director	The commercial is inspired by Snow White. The voiceover is done by Anne Meson.	
1999	"Kung-fu"	Timex wrist watch	Director		
2000	"Mannequin"	Timex wrist watch	Director	The commercial features Lisa Marie Smith, Burton's girlfriend at the time.	
2013	"Meeting with Tim Burton"	Samsung Mobile USA	Actor		

Music videos

Year	Artist	Title	Director	Producer	Writer	Ref(s)
2006	The Killers	"Bones"	Yes	No	Yes	
2012	Linkin Park	"Powerless"	No	Yes	No	
2012	The Killers	"Here with Me"	Yes	No	No	
2025	Lady Gaga	"The Dead Dance"	Yes	Yes	No	
2026	A$AP Rocky	"Don't Be Dumb"	No	No	No	Actor: "Himself"; Artwork designer

Video game

Year	Title	Notes	Ref.
2004	The Nightmare Before Christmas: Oogie's Revenge	Creative consultant	

== Critical reception ==
Critical, public and commercial reception to films Burton has directed as of August 2026.

Year	Film	Rotten Tomatoes	Metacritic	CinemaScore	Budget	Box office
1985	Pee-wee's Big Adventure	78% (115 reviews) (7.8/10)	47 (14 reviews)	—N/a	$7 million	$41 million (domestic)
1988	Beetlejuice	83% (115 reviews) (7.2/10)	70 (18 reviews)	B	$15 million	$84.6 million
1989	Batman	77% (141 reviews) (6.8/10)	69 (21 reviews)	A	$35 million	$411.5 million
1990	Edward Scissorhands	92% (71 reviews) (7.7/10)	74 (19 reviews)	A–	$20 million	$86 million
1992	Batman Returns	81% (93 reviews) (6.9/10)	68 (23 reviews)	B	$80 million	$282.8 million
1993	The Nightmare Before Christmas	95% (107 reviews) (6.9/10)	82 (31 reviews)	B	~$18 million	$108.8 million
1994	Ed Wood	92% (73 reviews) (8/10)	70 (19 reviews)	B+	$18 million	$5.9 million (domestic)
1996	Mars Attacks!	57% (90 reviews) (6/10)	52 (19 reviews)	B	$70 million	$101.4 million
1999	Sleepy Hollow	71% (129 reviews) (6.4/10)	65 (35 reviews)	B–	$100 million	$206.1 million
2001	Planet of the Apes	42% (203 reviews) (5.5/10)	50 (34 reviews)	B–	$100 million	$362.2 million
2003	Big Fish	76% (221 reviews) (7.2/10)	58 (42 reviews)	B+	$70 million	$122.9 million
2005	Charlie and the Chocolate Factory	83% (228 reviews) (7.2/10)	72 (40 reviews)	A–	$150 million	$475 million
2005	Corpse Bride	85% (200 reviews) (7.2/10)	83 (35 reviews)	B+	$40 million	$118.4 million
2007	Sweeney Todd: The Demon Barber of Fleet Street	86% (232 reviews) (7.7/10)	83 (39 reviews)	—N/a	$50 million	$153.4 million
2010	Alice in Wonderland	51% (279 reviews) (5.8/10)	53 (38 reviews)	A–	$200 million	$1.02 billion
2012	Dark Shadows	35% (263 reviews) (5.3/10)	55 (42 reviews)	B–	$150 million	$245.5 million
2012	Frankenweenie	87% (222 reviews) (7.6/10)	74 (38 reviews)	B+	$39 million	$87 million
2014	Big Eyes	72% (198 reviews) (6.7/10)	62 (40 reviews)	—N/a	$10 million	$29.3 million
2016	Miss Peregrine's Home for Peculiar Children	65% (258 reviews) (5.9/10)	57 (43 reviews)	B+	$110 million	$296.5 million
2019	Dumbo	46% (371 reviews) (5.55/10)	51 (54 reviews)	A–	$170 million	$353.3 million
2024	Beetlejuice Beetlejuice	76% (389 reviews) (6.6/10)	62 (61 reviews)	B	$100 million	$452 million
Total		72,85%	64		$1,534,000,000	$4,940,247,635

== See also ==
- Tim Burton's unrealized projects
