= Lost Vegas: Tim Burton =

Art exhibition

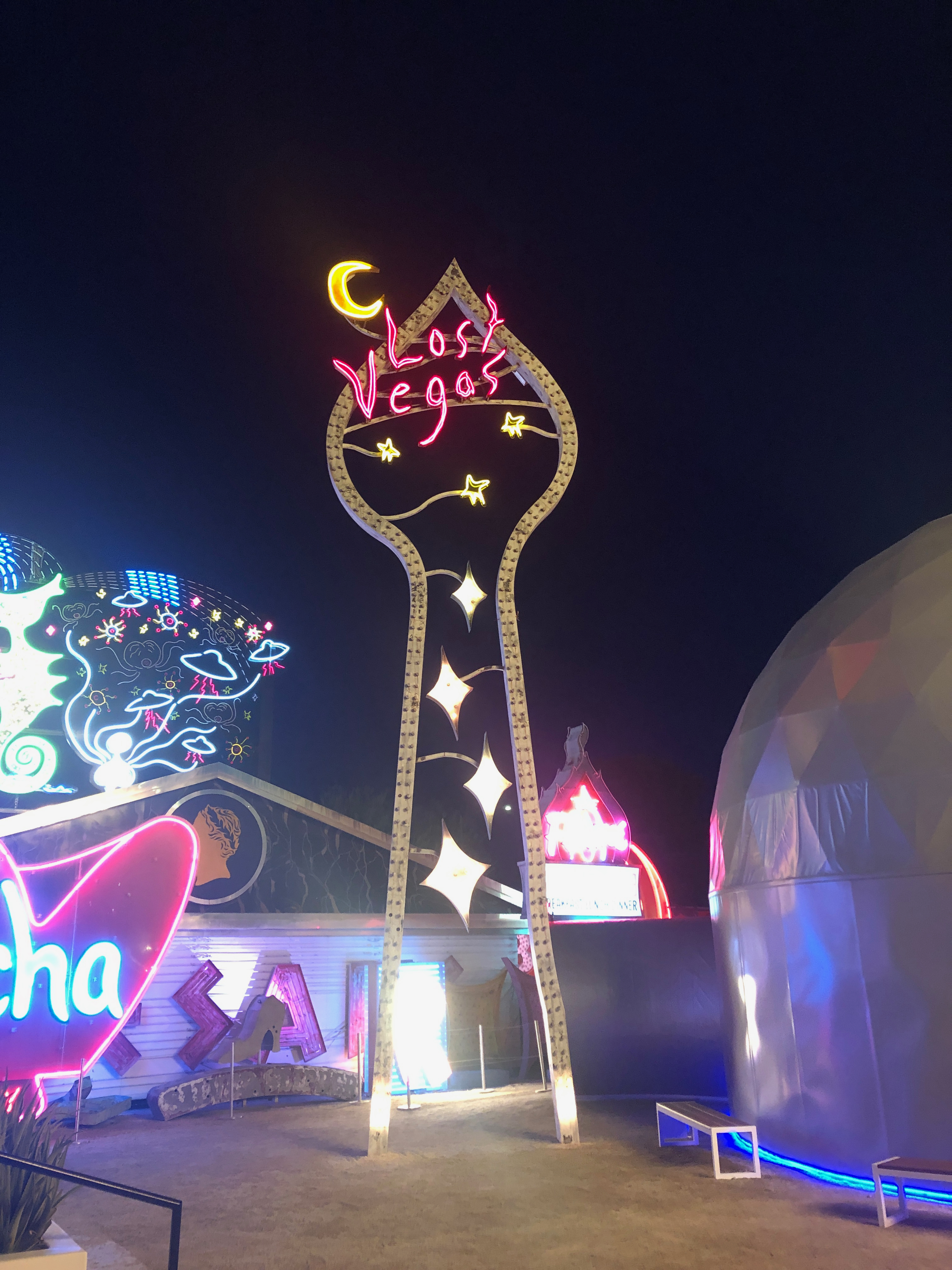
The "Lost Vegas Sign Tower" in Lost Vegas at the Neon Museum

Lost Vegas: Tim Burton was an art exhibition by Tim Burton at the Neon Museum in Las Vegas, Nevada in the United States. The exhibition ran from October 15, 2019, through February 15, 2020. It was Burton's first American exhibition since 2009.

== Exhibit ==
To create the series of installations, which include neon signs, poems, sculptures, photographs and dioramas, Burton pulled inspiration from memories of visiting Las Vegas as a child with his parents and from his films, including Mars Attacks!, which was filmed in Las Vegas, and Beetlejuice. Pieces were also inspired by The Melancholy Death of Oyster Boy & Other Stories and various unrealized projects.

The majority of the over 40 installations are in the Neon Boneyard, including a 40-foot-tall neon sign called the "Lost Vegas Sign Tower" and a collection of three UFO light-up sculptures titled "Flying Saucers". Burton's sculptures and installations are immersed amongst the neon signs permanently on display at the museum. Burton also contributed a temporary component to the museum's light projection installation, Brilliant.

Burton calls the exhibition "my own internal Burning Man." Jenny He served as curator of the exhibit.

== Reception ==
As a result of the show, museum attendance has increased, doubling on some days.

Jessica Gelt of The Los Angeles Times calls the show "delectably dark and campy." Claire Selvin of ARTnews called the show "a fantastical love letter to the city." The Hollywood Reporter called Lost Vegas "the greatest possible example of art imitating life and life returning the favor."

== Gallery ==
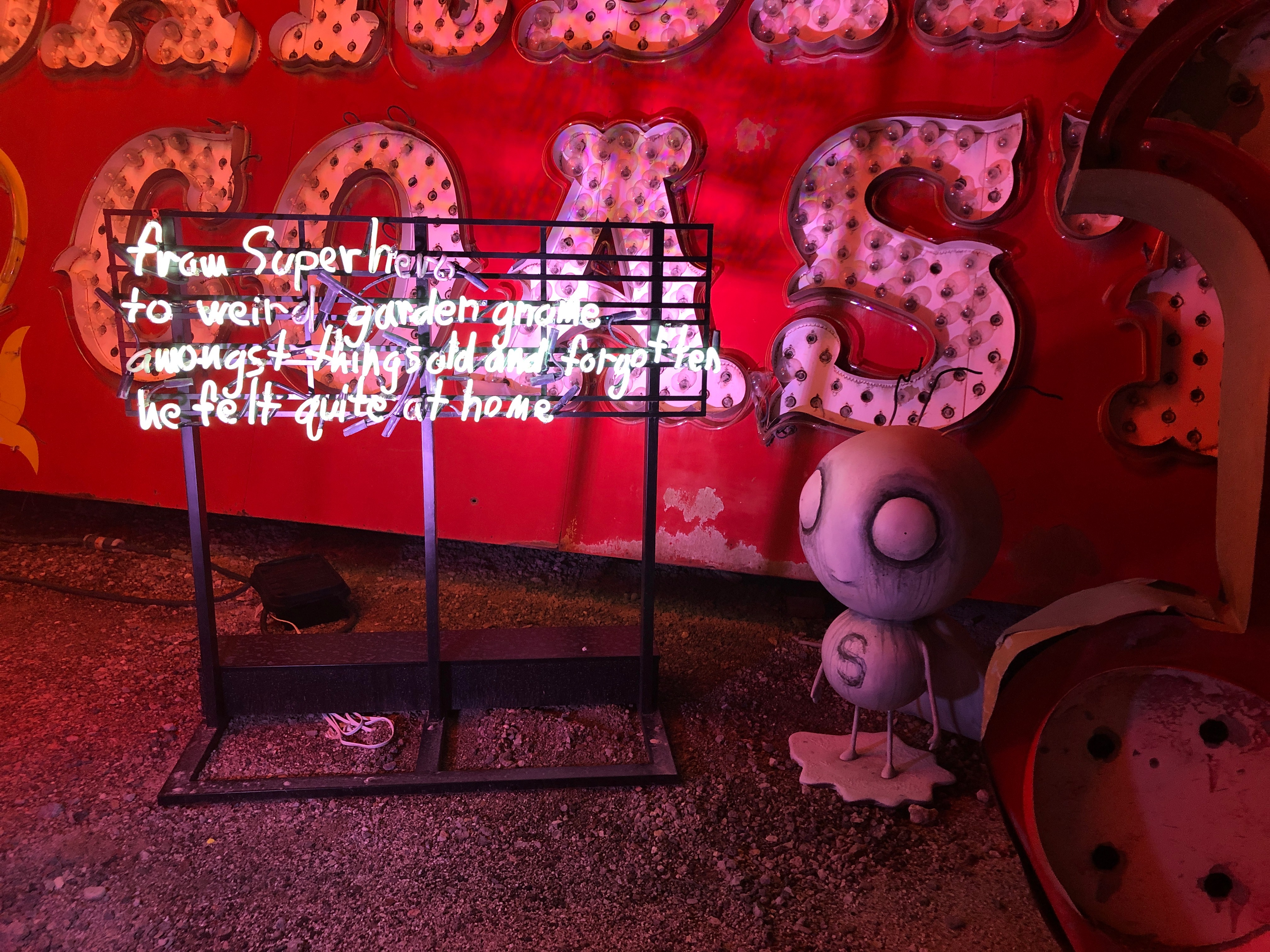
"Stainboy Poem" and Stainboy

Video of "Neon Grid Wall"

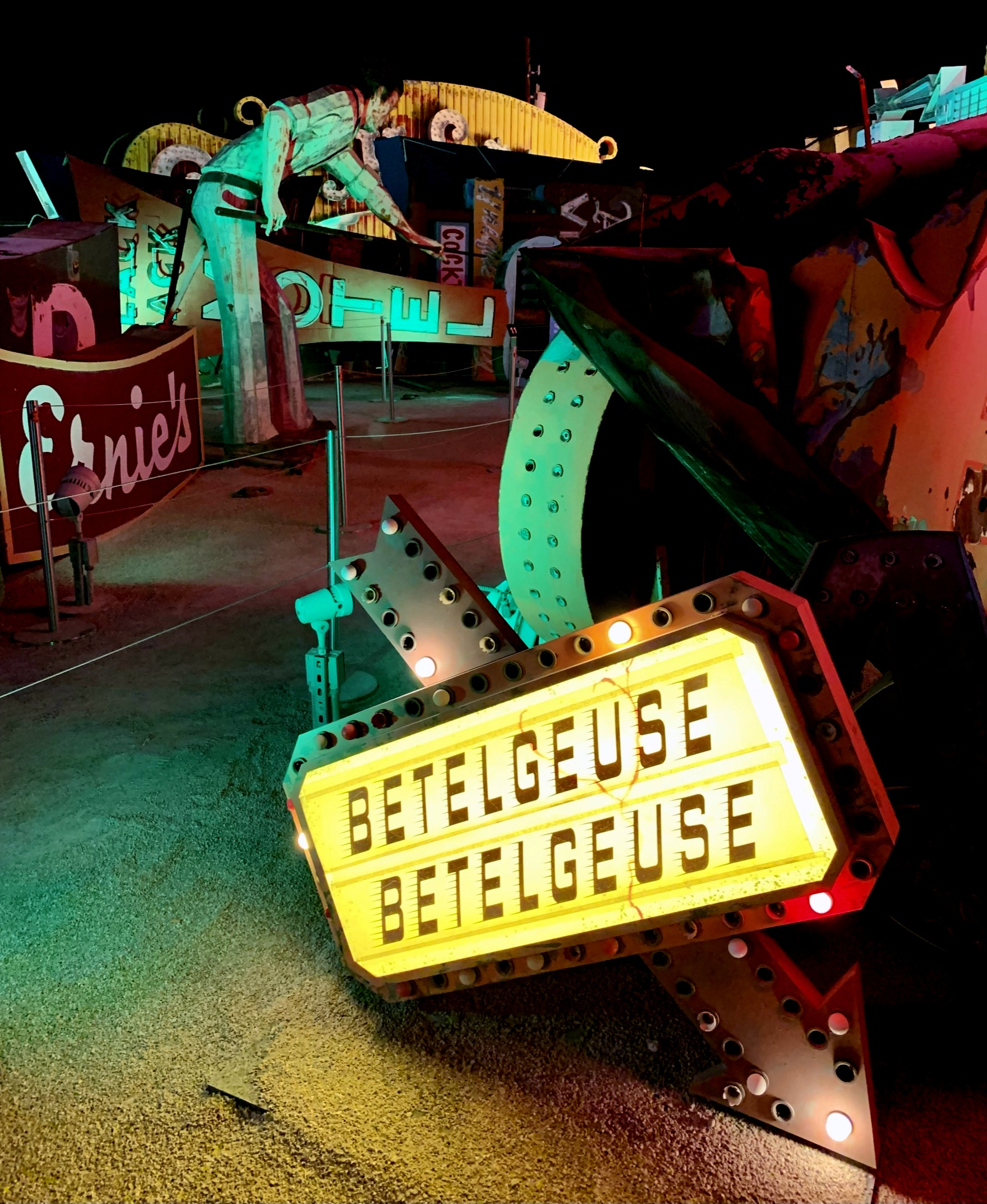
Sign from Beetlejuice
