= The Dead Dance =

2025 single by Lady Gaga

Single by Lady Gaga

from the album Mayhem (reissue)
- Released: September 3, 2025
- Genre: Synth-pop; disco
- Length: 3:48
- Label: Interscope
- Songwriters: Lady Gaga; Andrew Watt; Henry Walter
- Producers: Lady Gaga; Andrew Watt; Cirkut

Lady Gaga singles chronology
"Abracadabra" (2025)	"The Dead Dance" (2025)	"Runway" (2026)

Music video
- "The Dead Dance" on YouTube

"The Dead Dance" is a song by American singer and songwriter Lady Gaga. A synth-pop and disco track, it was released as a single through Interscope Records on September 3, 2025, and was included on the digital reissue of her 2025 album Mayhem. She wrote and produced the track with Andrew Watt and Cirkut, and described its lyrics as inspired by a romantic breakup, reflecting a shift from despair to joy and resilience through dance. The song was featured in the soundtrack for the second season of Wednesday (2025), in which Gaga also made a guest appearance.

"The Dead Dance" received positive reviews from journalists, who praised its production and rhythm, with several writers describing it as "catchy" and "infectious". It charted in the top 10 in Belgium and Lebanon, as well as the top 20 in Austria, the Czech Republic, Germany, Slovakia, Switzerland, and the United Kingdom, and the top 30 in Canada, France, Ireland, and Poland. It also reached number 13 on the Billboard Global 200 chart and earned several certifications, including platinum in France and silver in the United Kingdom.

An accompanying music video, directed by Tim Burton and filmed on the Island of the Dolls in Mexico, premiered on September 3, 2025. It received praise for its gothic, horror-inspired aesthetic and choreography, and was favorably compared to Michael Jackson's Thriller (1983). Gaga performed "The Dead Dance" for the first time at the 2025 MTV Video Music Awards, with staging that referenced the music video. She subsequently added the song to the setlist of The Mayhem Ball concert tour. It was nominated for Outstanding Original Music and Lyrics and Outstanding Choreography for Scripted Programming at the 78th Primetime Creative Arts Emmy Awards.

== Development ==
Following the release of the television series Wednesday in November 2022, a sped-up version of "Bloody Mary" (2011) by American singer and songwriter Lady Gaga was used alongside the titular character's dance and its fan recreations for video-sharing platform TikTok, which soon achieved viral popularity. Gaga herself acknowledged it and recreated the dance in a black-and-white video on December 9 that year, wearing goth makeup and an outfit similar to the one worn by actress Jenna Ortega.

After the series was renewed for a second season, Deadline Hollywood reported on May 7, 2024, that filming had begun in Ireland. Entertainment Weekly revealed on November 13 that Gaga had joined the cast in an undisclosed role. A year later, Gaga and Ortega appeared as special guests for Tudum, a pop culture event for streaming service Netflix, and performed a medley of "Zombieboy", "Abracadabra", and "Bloody Mary" on June 1, 2025. Gaga told Tudum.com that her involvement with Wednesday season 2 began when she was contacted about the show's search for new music. She already had a fitting song in mind, which ultimately also secured her a role in the series. She explained:

I immediately had a song in mind called "The Dead Dance", and I had started working on it. But once I knew it was going to be for Wednesday, I decided that I was going to work on it even more, and I made it extra special for the show. To me, when you know that music and pop culture and Tim Burton all come together with this cast, that's a very special recipe.

In an interview with the Los Angeles Times, series creators Alfred Gough and Miles Millar explained that Gaga had reserved the song specifically for the show, saying: "When we heard the lyrics, it was almost as if she had written the song for the series. We always planned a big moment in episode seven, and this incredible track became the icing on the cake, turning it into a celebration of friendship and renewal for Enid and Agnes."

== Promotion and release ==
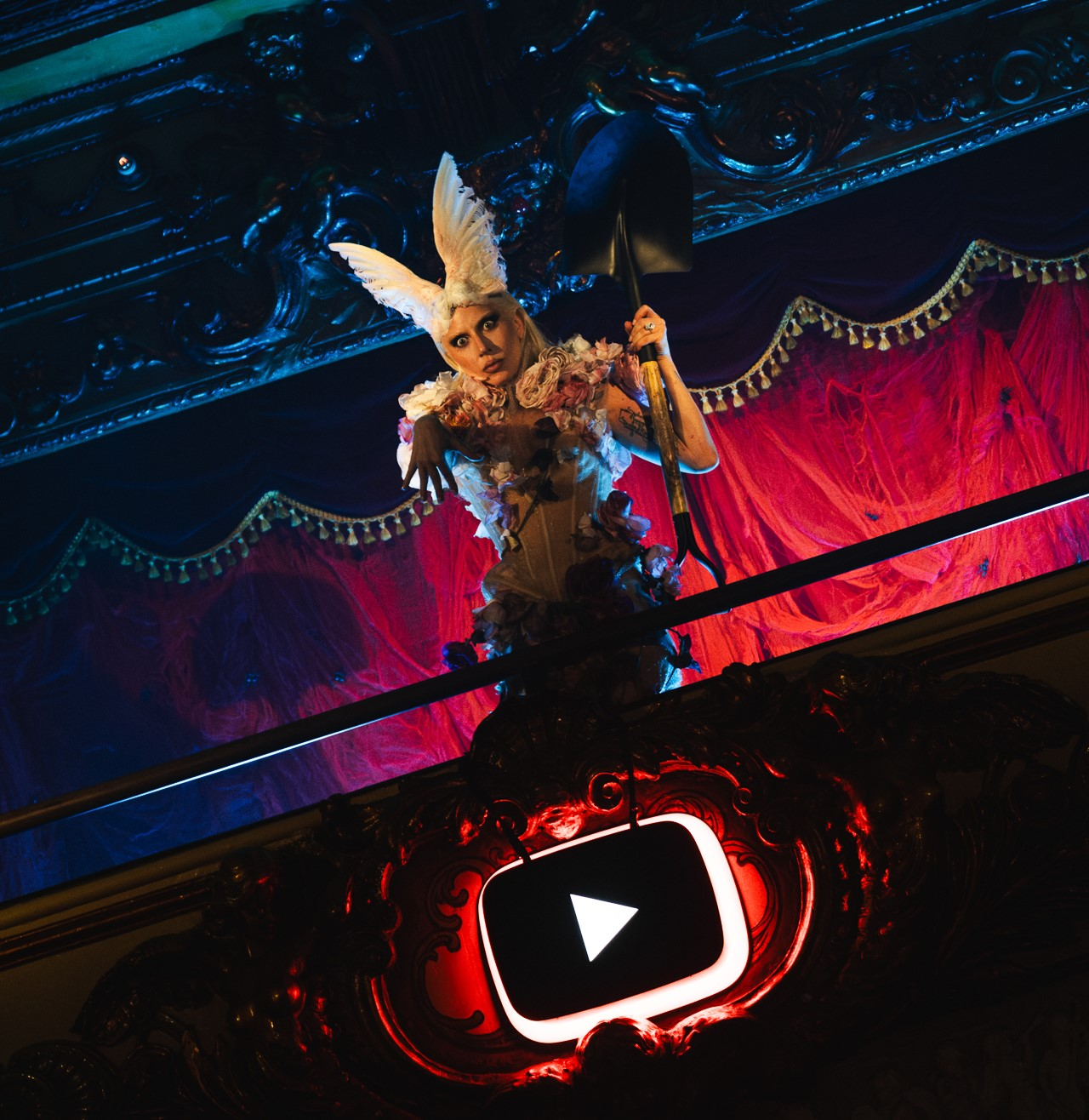
Gaga dancing to "The Dead Dance" at a Mayhem-themed Halloween event organized by YouTube in October 2025

In late August 2025, Gaga teased the song during a virtual "meet and greet" event on the gaming platform Roblox, where she and fans designed Mayhem-inspired outfits for a Dress to Impress catwalk competition. She later confirmed her participation by sharing a photo of herself playing the game on an iPad with the caption, "In case you were wondering if it was me". On August 28, Gaga made a surprise appearance at joint between Netflix and Spotify, Wednesday "Graveyard Gala" event in New York City, where she officially announced "The Dead Dance" and previewed the track for attendees inside themed coffins.

"The Dead Dance" was released on September 3, 2025, for digital download and streaming via Interscope Records, coinciding with the second half of the second season of Wednesday. It was sent to radio airplay in Italy the following day through Universal, and to contemporary hit radio in the United States on September 9, 2025, by Interscope. The season featured the song in the seventh episode "Woe Me the Money", in which Enid (Emma Myers) and Agnes (Evie Templeton) perform a dance during the Nevermore Gala as a distraction. The choreography was developed during filming using a click track and a stand-in song with a similar tempo, as the final track was not played on set. Gaga herself also appeared as new character Rosaline Rotwood in the preceding episode, "Woe Thyself".

On September 2, Gaga unveiled the single's cover art and confirmed the release schedule for the track and its accompanying music video through a social media post. Shortly after, the track was also added to the digital tracklist of Mayhem on streaming platforms as the ninth track, making it the album's latest single. On 30 October 2025, Gaga attended a Mayhem-themed Halloween event held in collaboration with YouTube at Barcelona's La Paloma venue, where she danced along to some of her songs, including doing the choreography of "The Dead Dance".

== Composition ==
"The Dead Dance" was written and produced by Gaga, Andrew Watt, and Cirkut. It is an upbeat synth-pop track with a disco bassline, elements of funk, 1980s inspired synths, and flashes of electric guitar. According to Billboard's Gil Kaufman, it has "a vibrant 1980s electropop vibe, driven by funhouse keyboards and sparkling beats". Various outlets noted the sonic influence of Michael Jackson's "Thriller" (1982) on the song. Margaret Farrell from Stereogum felt it is situated stylistically between Jackson's "Wanna Be Startin' Somethin'" (1983) and Daft Punk's "Get Lucky" (2013). In the chorus, Gaga predominantly uses her head voice, accompanied by bright funk guitar textures.

In the lyrics, Gaga urges listeners to join in on a "dead dance". Gaga explained that the lyrics were inspired by the aftermath of a breakup, with the line "I'll keep on dancing till I'm dead" representing perseverance and "taking the power back". Variety described the song's progression as one of "transformation and celebration", as its focus shifts from heartbreak toward finding joy with friends. According to GO's Dan Tracer, the song musically feels like a mix between the rhythms of Chromatica (2020) and the darker textures of Mayhem, while its lyrics "walk a line between defiant and somewhat more unsettling." At Netflix's "Graveyard Gala" event, Gaga explained that the track deals with the aftermath of a breakup and the shift from despair to finding joy with friends, elaborating:

The inspiration for "The Dead Dance" was a breakup, and it was all about the way that we sometimes feel when it's over; how a relationship ending can kill our ability to feel hopeful about love. It's got this really cool, funky beat underneath it. And that is when the song becomes not just about the relationship; it becomes about having fun with your friends when you've been through something tough and amazing.

Producer Andrew Watt told Rolling Stone that the team aimed to make the track "as danceable as possible", and that the production shifted several times depending on the title and the way Gaga sang. He added that "when they were working on the bridge, it got really funky, and that's where the line 'do the dead dance' came from". Sheet music published by Musicnotes indicates that "The Dead Dance" is written in the key of A minor and has an allegretto tempo of 123 beats per minute. Gaga's vocal range spans from G3 to G5.

== Critical reception ==
Journalists from Cosmopolitan and Phoenix New Times recommended "The Dead Dance" in their lists of the best Halloween tracks, with the latter's Shi Bradley claiming "it's hard to find a better Halloween party song than this one". NME's Tom Skinner described it as "spooky", Juliana Ukiomogre of Elle highlighted the chorus as "eerily haunting", while contributors to the BrooklynVegan saw it as Gaga "at her creepiest and her danciest". Billboard's Gil Kaufman and Jason Lipschutz found the track a "banger" and a "twitchy, propulsive pop anthem", respectively, in their reviews. Daisy Carter of DIY opined that "The Dead Dance" is "an all-out instant classic that calls back to the pulsing synth-pop of Gaga's earliest days".

Joan Summers of Paper called it a "great track" with "faboulous" production, and stated the song's most memorable parts are the pounding synths that kick in during the second verse. MelodicMag's Germano Blanco praised its "irresistible" chorus and said the track shows once again that Gaga is unmatched at crafting catchy hooks. Tomás Mier and Emily Zemler of Rolling Stone called it a "vibrant pop track" and an "infectious contribution" to the Wednesday soundtrack, also praising its rhythm. Bryget Chrisfield of Rolling Stone Australia opined the track has a pop style reminiscent of Kylie Minogue, but "Gaga's belting gives it extra oomph". "The Dead Dance" received the Best Original Song – TV Show/Limited Series award at the Hollywood Music in Media Awards in 2025.

== Commercial performance ==
Internationally, "The Dead Dance" debuted at number thirteen on the Billboard Global 200, becoming the fourth track from Mayhem to reach the chart’s top 15. It also entered at number ten on the Billboard Global Excl. U.S. chart, accumulating 28 million streams and 5,000 copies sold during the tracking week of September 5–11.

In the United States, the track debuted at number forty on the Billboard Hot 100 chart dated September 20, 2025, with 8.7 million official streams, 7.8 million in radio airplay audience, and 5,000 sold during the tracking week of September 5–11. This achievement marked Gaga's 29th career top-forty entry on the chart and the fourth from Mayhem, after "Die with a Smile", "Disease", and "Abracadabra". In Canada, it reached number 28 on the Canadian Hot 100, while in Brazil it peaked at number 56 on the Brasil Hot 100 and received a double-platinum certification from Pro-Música Brasil.

In the United Kingdom, it entered at number thirteen on the UK Singles Chart, marking the second-highest debut of the week and Gaga's 33rd top-40 song in the country. This made Mayhem become her second album to place five songs within the top 40 in the UK. The British Phonographic Industry (BPI) awarded it silver certification. In France, the song debuted at number 38 on the French Singles Chart, becoming Gaga's thirty-first top-forty entry in the country, and later peaked at number 24. It was subsequently certified platinum by the Syndicat National de l'Édition Phonographique (SNEP). In Germany, the track debuted at number twelve, while in Switzerland it entered at number 17 and in Ireland it opened at number 30. Elsewhere in Europe, the song peaked at number four in Wallonia and number seven in Flanders, as well as reaching number nine in Greece, number twelve in the Czech Republic, and number eighteen in Austria. It also charted in countries including Slovakia, Portugal, Norway, and Spain.

In Australia, "The Dead Dance" opened at number 50 and was the only new entry on the chart that week, rising to number 43 in its second week. In New Zealand, the song debuted at number three on the Hot 40 Singles Chart, an extension of the main chart. It also reached number five on the Billboard Japan Hot Overseas chart, which tracks the most popular songs by Western artists in the country.

== Music video ==
=== Development ===
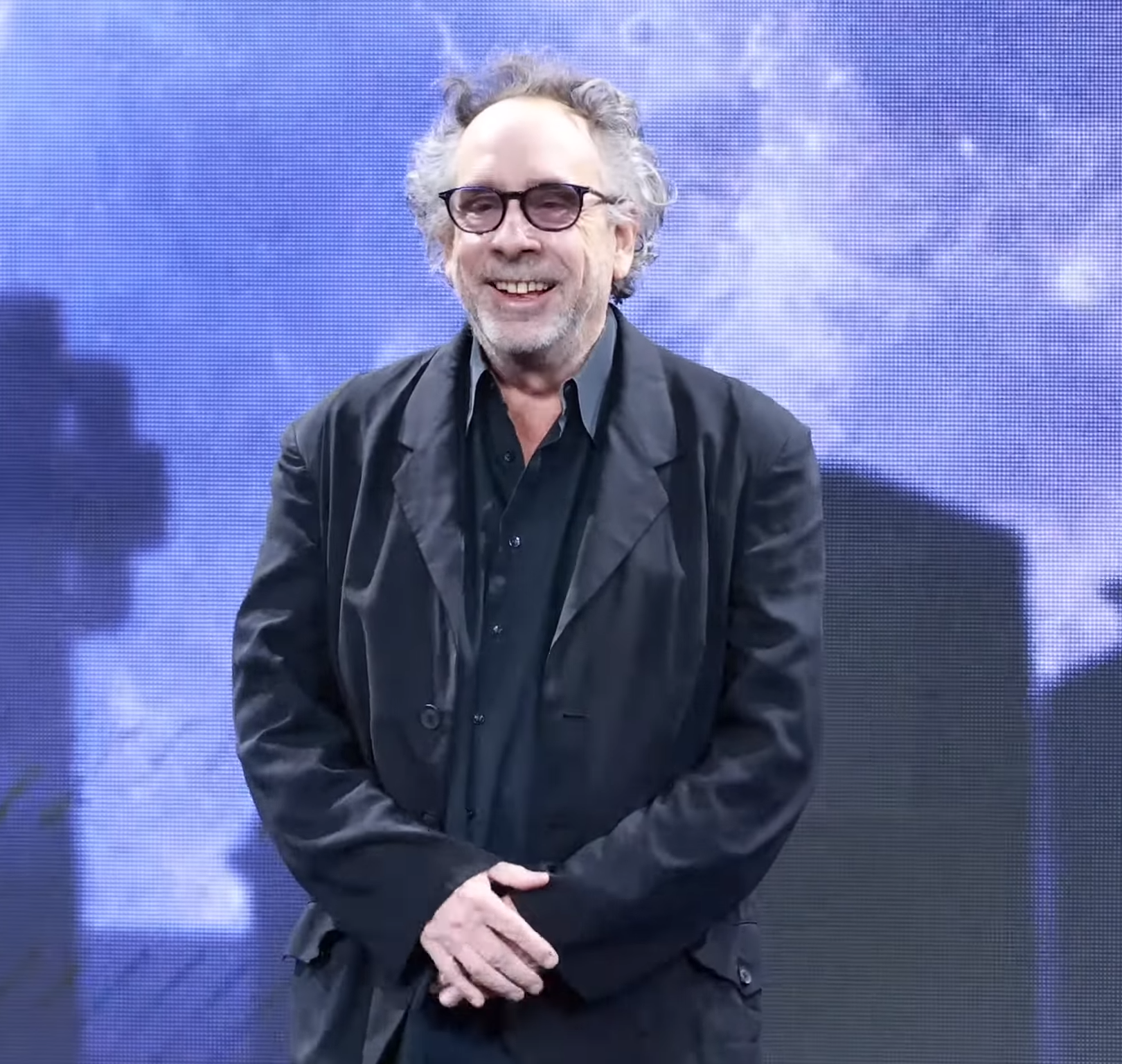
Tim Burton (pictured in 2025) directed the song's music video.

The music video for "The Dead Dance" was directed by Burton and produced by Gaga and Michael Polansky, alongside Burton and Natalie Testa. It was the first music video directed by Burton since the video for The Killers' 2012 single "Here with Me". It was filmed at the Island of the Dolls in Mexico in mid-July 2025. The Express Tribune reported on July 10, that Gaga and Burton had been seen filming a music video on the Island of the Dolls, located in the south of Mexico City, Mexico. During the Giffoni Film Festival on July 25, Burton spoke about Gaga's contribution to Wednesday and hinted that he had "done something else with her". Following the premiere of Wednesday's second season, Variety reported on August 4 that Gaga and Burton filmed a music video for a song supposedly titled "Dead Dance". Regarding his experience developing the video, Burton praised Gaga's work, describing her as "inspiring" and an artist he respects and feels connected to, while also expressing his desire to collaborate with her again in the future.

The choreography was handled by Parris Goebel, who had previously worked with Gaga on the music videos for "Disease" and "Abracadabra", and Corey Baker, who had created The Dead Dance routine for Wednesday, while the costumes were designed by Colleen Atwood. The visual effects were handled by the Mexican studio The Roots Production Service under the direction of Carlos Llergo, with cinematography by Andrés Arochi and additional set and doll design provided by the art department. Camila López, an assistant in the art department, said Burton personally selected the dolls featured in the video, some of which he had designed himself.

=== Synopsis ===
The music video takes place in a graveyard and begins with Gaga perched motionless on a wall surrounded by dozens of dolls, which gradually come to life as she starts to dance. She slowly spasms to life, and as she begins to move, the dolls awaken alongside her. During the first chorus, masked dancers join her to perform a choreographed routine as night falls and more dolls awaken to the rhythm of the song. The visual opens in black and white but introduces color as it progresses. The choreography features abrupt, jerky movements that evoke a reanimated corpse.

Gaga wears a Victorian-inspired outfit and makeup that gives the illusion of cracked porcelain. Her ensemble consists of a two-piece set with a corset bustier and ribbon details, paired with a tiered skirt. Toward the end of the video, she removes both garments to reveal a babydoll tank top and puffed pants. Her look is completed with tightly coiled platinum blonde curls and makeup emphasizing pale, fractured skin with jet-black lipstick.

=== Reception ===
Gaga sitting among dolls in a graveyard set, wearing a Victorian-inspired gown and cracked porcelain makeup — a look journalists compared to the title character of What Ever Happened to Baby Jane?.

The music video received positive reviews upon release. Natalia Cano of Billboard described the video as combining "dark, gothic and fantastical elements" characteristic of both Gaga and Burton's work. Caro mentioned its being filmed on the Island of the Dolls in Xochimilco, a site filled with decaying dolls that create "a chilling and eerie atmosphere". She also called attention to the choreography being reminiscent of Michael Jackson's Thriller (1983). Billboard's Gil Kaufman regarded it as one of the best music videos for Halloween, with Gaga "hosting a dead can dance party while dressed as a raggedy Baby Jane", and a "throat-clutching, hand-jiving" dance routine. Alexa Camp of Slant Magazine praised the video, writing that it presents Gaga "looking like a cross between Baby Jane and Courtney Love" and portrays her as "a possessed doll who spasms to life", with movements that nod to the choreography from Michael Jackson's "Thriller" video. Bianca Betancourt of Harper's Bazaar described the video as "quintessential Gaga" in possession of "fabulously frightening" visual, with praise for Burton's direction and Parris Goebel's choreography.

Scott Sterling of Consequence mentioned the use of visuals to make use of the abundance of creepy dolls. He also observed that while the video begins in black and white, it briefly shifts to color during its final third. Max Pilley of NME emphsized the "black-and-white visuals with abandoned dolls brought to life by the song's funk-inspired hooks", adding that Gaga's "angular dance moves invoke 'Thriller' and The Rocky Horror Picture Show (1975)". Bianca Cosulich of Marie Claire praised the production for its aesthetic and choreography. She noted that it "revives one of Mexico's most famous urban legends" by being filmed on the Island of the Dolls, and emphasized positive fan reaction to the way the video "spotlights Mexican culture". The Express Tribune described it as "a spectacle that feels both theatrical and sinister".

Tyler Damara Kelly wrote for The Line of Best Fit that "the cinematic video shifts between stark black-and-white and bursts of vivid color, interweaving unsettling images of dolls with Gaga’s performance." Sonal Pandya of Times Now noted the video's "macabre feel with porcelain doll imagery", focusing on Gaga's cracked doll styling and the shift from black-and-white to pink-tinted color. Andi Ortiz of TheWrap described the video as "about exactly as creepy as you would expect a collaboration between Lady Gaga and Tim Burton to be," while Sam Damshenas of Gay Times called it "a camp horror spectacle." Mexican outlets such as El Universal and Telemundo praised the video's gothic and cinematic aesthetic, with emphasis on how the use of Xochimilco's Island of the Dolls added a "haunting atmosphere" and "cultural resonance" by bringing the site's legends to life.

Shortly after the video's release, a viral post on Twitter accused the production of using artificial intelligence (AI) to animate the dolls, citing alleged distortions in their hands during the chorus. The claim sparked debate online, but official credits listed a VFX supervisor and a full team behind the animation. Line producer Carlos Llergo also denied the allegations, clarifying that the moving dolls were "animated in a VFX studio," and the video's on-location filming at the Island of the Dolls further reinforced its practical production.

== Live performances and other appearances ==
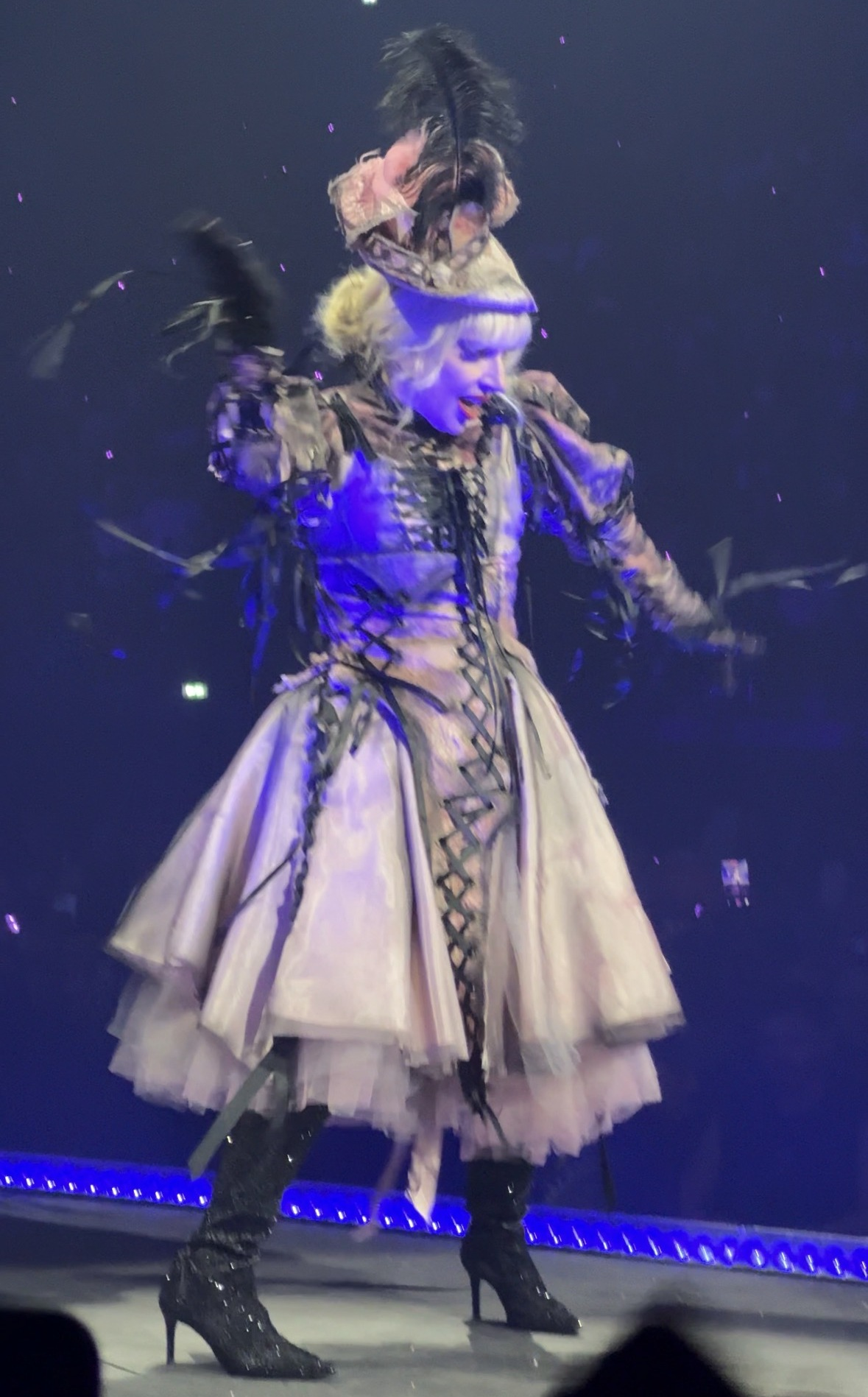
Gaga performing the song on The Mayhem Ball in 2025

Gaga performed "The Dead Dance" for the first time at the 2025 MTV Video Music Awards on September 7, in a pre-recorded segment filmed at Madison Square Garden in New York City the previous day, where she was performing as part of The Mayhem Ball concert tour. The performance began with "Abracadabra", sung atop the Tudor-style red gown characteristic of the tour, which opened to reveal the dancers. She then descended to the stage and launched into "The Dead Dance", wearing a white Victorian outfit and doll-like makeup with curly gray hair, similar to the music video. Outlets such as Billboard, Rolling Stone, Harper's Bazaar, and Pitchfork highlighted its haunted-doll persona, gothic ballroom aesthetic, and hypnotic choreography. Billboard's Joe Lynch also ranked it the third best performance of the event, writing that it "managed to cause one of the biggest sensations of the night", while Samantha Olson from Cosmopolitan considered it the best of the night, noting that "20 years into her career Gaga still has the vocals, choreo and fashion sense that made fans fall in love".

Beginning with the September 11, 2025, concert in Toronto, the song was added to the set list of The Mayhem Ball. It was included in the third act of the show, where Gaga performed it in a new white dance outfit with oversized sleeves, a poofy skirt, three black bows, and black gloves. It was performed following "Zombieboy" and remained in the set list through the February 23, 2026, concert in Inglewood, California. During the September 29, 2025, concert in London, Wednesday cast members Emma Myers and Evie Templeton joined Gaga on stage for the performance of "The Dead Dance" and "LoveDrug". The trio performed the same routine featured in the series, with Myers and Templeton wearing matching gothic gowns coordinated with Gaga's outfit. Critics from The London Standard and Clash described the performance as drawing on Tim Burton-inspired aesthetics. Thomas H. Green of The Arts Desk found the "steroid disco twosome" of "Zombieboy" and "The Dead Dance" one of show's highlights. He compared Gaga's look to Miss Havisham, a character from the Charles Dickens novel Great Expectations.

In December 2025, "The Dead Dance" became available as part of a Lady Gaga music pack in the virtual reality rhythm game Synth Riders.

== Accolades ==
Organization	Year	Category	Result	Ref.
Camerimage	2025	Best Cinematography in a Music Video	Nominated	
Camerimage	2025	Best Music Video	Nominated	
Clio Music Awards	2026	Mixed Campaign (Lady Gaga #TheDeadDanceOnShorts)	Silver	
Costume Designers Guild Awards	2026	Excellence in Short Form Design	Nominated	
Hollywood Music in Media Awards	2025	Best Original Song – TV Show/Limited Series	Won	
Primetime Emmy Awards	2026	Outstanding Original Music and Lyrics	Nominated	
Primetime Emmy Awards	2026	Outstanding Choreography for Scripted Programming	Nominated	
RTHK International Pop Poll Awards	2025	Top Ten International Gold Songs	Nominated	
Žebřík Music Awards	2025	Best International Music Video	Pending	

== Charts ==
=== Weekly charts ===
Chart (2025–2026)	Peak position
Argentina Airplay (Monitor Latino)	16
Australia (ARIA)	43
Austria (Ö3 Austria Top 40)	18
Belarus Airplay (TopHit)	4
Belgium (Ultratop 50 Flanders)	7
Belgium (Ultratop 50 Wallonia)	4
Bolivia Anglo Airplay (Monitor Latino)	3
Brazil Hot 100 (Billboard)	56
Bulgaria Airplay (PROPHON)	2
Canada Hot 100 (Billboard)	28
Canada AC (Billboard)	4
Canada CHR/Top 40 (Billboard)	9
Canada Hot AC (Billboard)	8
Central America Anglo Airplay (Monitor Latino)	5
Chile Anglo Airplay (Monitor Latino)	3
Colombia Anglo Airplay (National-Report)	10
CIS Airplay (TopHit)	2
Costa Rica Anglo Airplay (Monitor Latino)	4
Croatia International Airplay (Top lista)	1
Czech Republic Airplay (ČNS IFPI)	3
Czech Republic Singles Digital (ČNS IFPI)	12
Denmark Airplay (Tracklisten)	2
Dominican Republic Anglo Airplay (Monitor Latino)	11
Ecuador Anglo Airplay (Monitor Latino)	4
Estonia Airplay (TopHit)	2
Finland (Suomen virallinen lista)	49
France (SNEP)	24
Germany (GfK)	12
Global 200 (Billboard)	13
Greece International (IFPI)	9
Guatemala Anglo Airplay (Monitor Latino)	2
Hungary (Dance Top 40)	25
Hungary (Rádiós Top 40)	1
Hungary (Single Top 40)	35
Iceland (Tónlistinn)	39
Ireland (IRMA)	27
Israel International Airplay (Media Forest)	5
Italy (FIMI)	56
Japan Hot Overseas (Billboard Japan)	5
Kazakhstan Airplay (TopHit)	4
Latin America Anglo Airplay (Monitor Latino)	4
Latvia Airplay (LaIPA)	1
Latvia Streaming (LaIPA)	19
Lebanon (Lebanese Top 20)	2
Lithuania (AGATA)	44
Lithuania Airplay (TopHit)	1
Mexico Airplay (Monitor Latino)	16
Moldova Airplay (TopHit)	51
Netherlands (Dutch Top 40)	6
Netherlands (Single Top 100)	42
New Zealand Hot Singles (RMNZ)	3
Nicaragua Airplay (Monitor Latino)	13
Norway (IFPI Norge)	53
Panama Anglo Airplay (Monitor Latino)	9
Peru Airplay (Monitor Latino)	19
Poland (Polish Airplay Top 100)	9
Poland (Polish Streaming Top 100)	30
Portugal (AFP)	47
Puerto Rico Anglo Airplay (Monitor Latino)	4
Romania Airplay (Media Forest)	20
Romania Airplay (TopHit) DJ Dark Remix	76
Russia Airplay (TopHit)	3
San Marino Airplay (SMRTV Top 50)	1
Serbia Airplay (Radiomonitor)	2
Slovakia Airplay (ČNS IFPI)	1
Slovakia Singles Digital (ČNS IFPI)	28
Slovenia Airplay (Radiomonitor)	12
South Africa Airplay (TOSAC)	8
South Korea BGM (Circle)	63
South Korea Download (Circle)	110
Spain (Promusicae)	69
Suriname (Nationale Top 40)	16
Sweden (Sverigetopplistan)	40
Switzerland (Schweizer Hitparade)	17
Turkey International Airplay (Radiomonitor Türkiye)	1
Ukraine Airplay (TopHit)	12
UK Singles (Official Charts)	13
Uruguay Anglo Airplay (Monitor Latino)	6
US Billboard Hot 100	40
US Adult Contemporary (Billboard)	25
US Adult Pop Airplay (Billboard)	8
US Hot Dance/Pop Songs (Billboard)	3
US Pop Airplay (Billboard)	11
Venezuela Airplay (Record Report)	96

=== Monthly charts ===
Chart (2025–2026)	Peak position
Belarus Airplay (TopHit)	6
CIS Airplay (TopHit)	2
Estonia Airplay (TopHit)	8
Kazakhstan Airplay (TopHit)	6
Latvia Airplay (TopHit)	16
Lithuania Airplay (TopHit)	2
Moldova Airplay (TopHit)	60
Romania Airplay (TopHit)	80
Romania Airplay (TopHit) DJ Dark Remix	83
Russia Airplay (TopHit)	3
Ukraine Airplay (TopHit)	17

=== Year-end charts ===
Chart (2025)	Position
Argentina Anglo Airplay (Monitor Latino)	24
Belarus Airplay (TopHit)	98
Belgium (Ultratop 50 Flanders)	93
Belgium (Ultratop 50 Wallonia)	95
Canada AC (Billboard)	73
Canada CHR/Top 40 (Billboard)	96
Canada Hot AC (Billboard)	79
CIS Airplay (TopHit)	33
Estonia Airplay (TopHit)	56
Hungary (Rádiós Top 40)	63
Kazakhstan Airplay (TopHit)	96
Latvia Airplay (TopHit)	114
Lithuania Airplay (TopHit)	16
Netherlands (Dutch Top 40)	46
Poland (Polish Airplay Top 100)	96
Russia Airplay (TopHit)	57
US Hot Dance/Pop Songs (Billboard)	19

== Certifications ==
Certifications
Region	Certification	Certified units/sales
Belgium (BRMA)	Gold	20,000^{‡}
Brazil (Pro-Música Brasil)	2× Platinum	80,000^{‡}
France (SNEP)	Platinum	200,000^{‡}
United Kingdom (BPI)	Silver	200,000^{‡}
^{‡} Sales+streaming figures based on certification alone.

== Release history ==
Region	Date	Format(s)	Label	Ref.
Various	September 3, 2025	Digital download; streaming	Interscope	
Italy	September 4, 2025	Radio airplay	Universal	
United States	September 9, 2025	Contemporary hit radio	Interscope	

== See also ==
- Tim Burton filmography
