= Stainboy =

2000 animated short film directed by Tim Burton

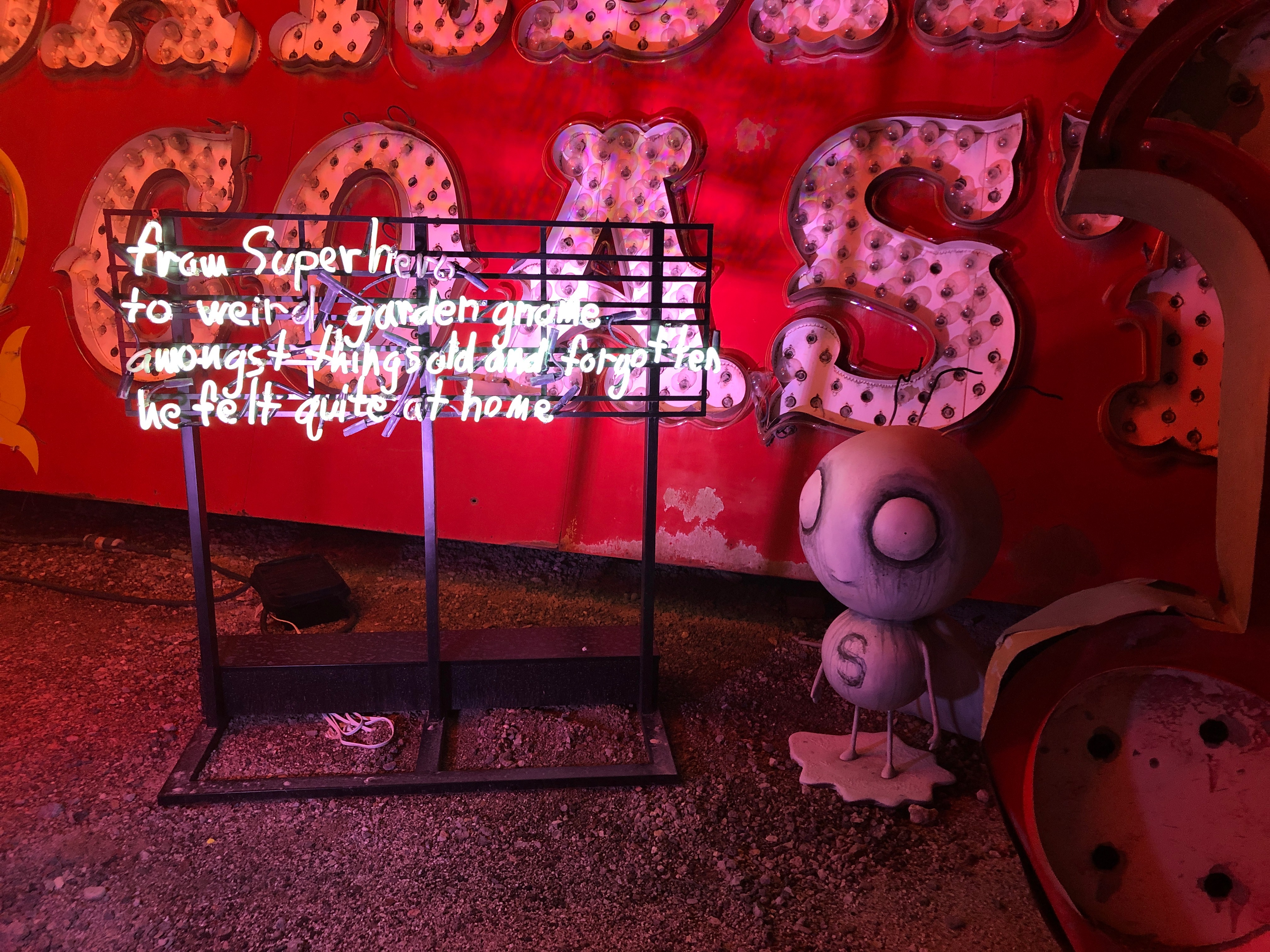
Stainboy with poem as part of Lost Vegas: Tim Burton

The World of Stainboy is a series of Flash animation shorts created in 2000 by director Tim Burton and animated by Flinch Studio. The character Stainboy first appeared in two short poems in the book The Melancholy Death of Oyster Boy & Other Stories, also created and illustrated by Tim Burton. The series is Burton's first foray into the superhero genre since Batman Returns.

In the shorts, Stainboy works for the Burbank police, and at the start of each episode he is ordered to investigate and bring in social outcasts. Many of the outcasts are characters from the Oyster Boy book. Each of the six episodes is under five minutes in length. The final episode had Stainboy living through a flashback to his early childhood at an orphanage, implying the beginning of a larger storyline, although no further episodes were produced.

In November 2010, Burton began a new story about Stainboy, on the Twitter account "BurtonStory". Fans could contribute to the story via Twitter, and the best continuation Tweets of the day would be re-Tweeted by BurtonStory. The project ended on December 6.

== List of episodes ==
1. "Stare Girl"
2. "Toxic Boy"
3. "Bowling Ball Head"
4. "Robot Boy"
5. "Matchstick Girl"
6. "The Origin of Stainboy"
