= Ralph Votrian =

American film, television and voice actor

- Born: May 16, 1934; Chicago, Illinois, U.S.
- Died: February 7, 2017 (aged 82); Burbank, California, U.S.
- Occupation(s): Film, television and voice actor

Ralph Votrian (May 16, 1934 – February 7, 2017) was an American film, television and voice actor.

Votrian was born in Chicago, Illinois. As a child, Votrian performed on old-time radio programs. He graduated from John Burroughs High School in Burbank, California, and served in the United States Marine Corps.

He appeared in the films Stalk of the Celery Monster, Girls in the Night, The Bold and the Brave, Until They Sail, The Happy Years, Screaming Eagles, The Young Guns and Pillars of the Sky.

Votrian guest-starred in television programs including The Twilight Zone, Johnny Ringo, Black Saddle, Dr. Hudson's Secret Journal, The Tall Man, Rescue 8 and Rawhide. He provided additional voices for television programs such as El-Hazard, As Told by Ginger, Masked Rider (as King Lexian) Rave Master and Gatchaman (OVA), and was the narrator for Reign: The Conqueror.

Votrian died on February 7, 2017, in Burbank, California, at the age of 82.
