= Tim Burton's unrealized projects =

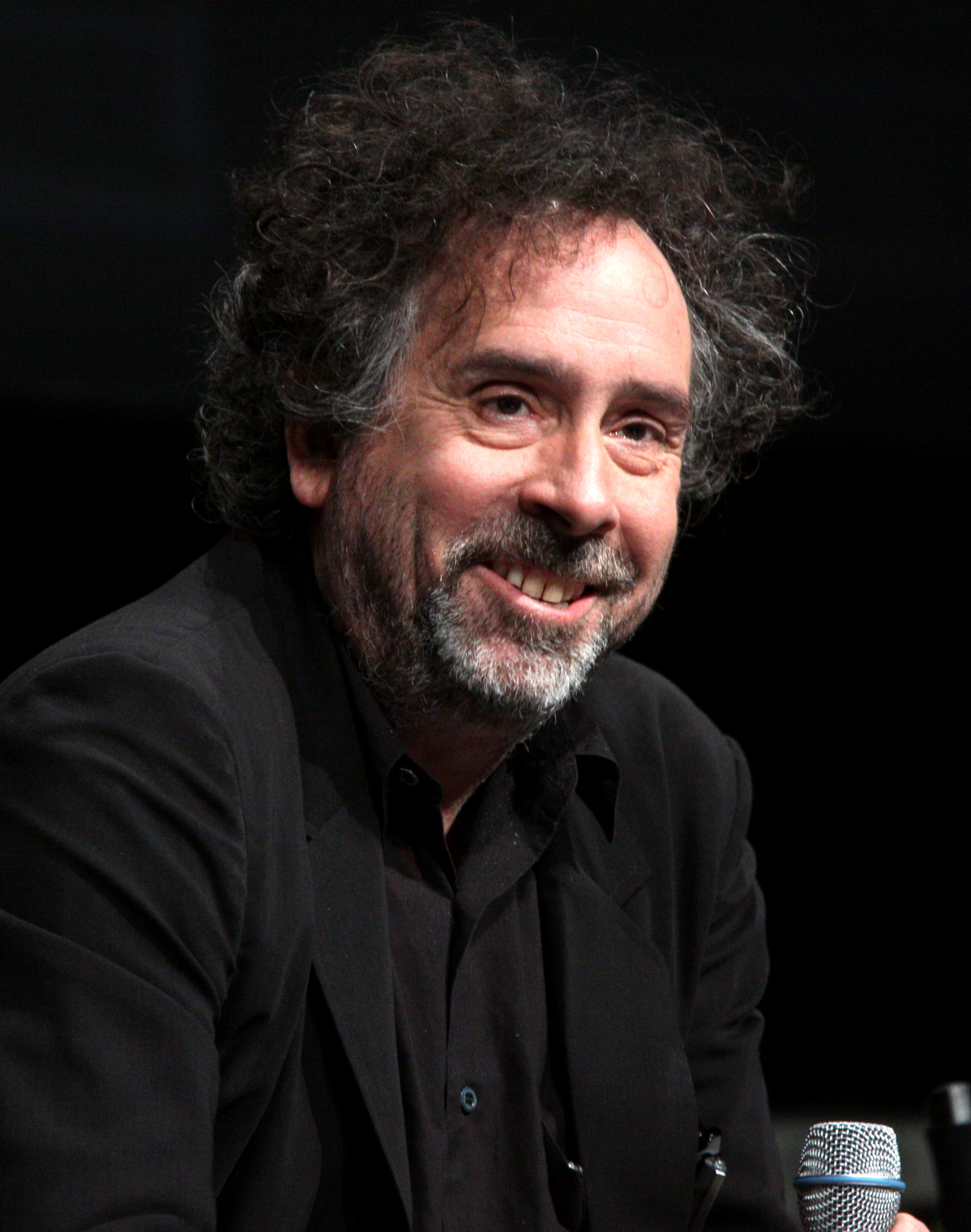
Burton in 2012

During a career that has spanned over 30 years, Tim Burton has worked on a number of projects which never progressed beyond the pre-production stage under his direction.

== 1980s ==
=== After Hours ===
Burton was originally attached to direct the 1985 film After Hours, but Martin Scorsese read the script at a time when he was unable to get financial backing to complete The Last Temptation of Christ, which was finally completed in 1988. Burton gladly stepped aside when Scorsese expressed interest in directing After Hours.

=== House of Wax ===
Burton was set to direct a remake of House of Wax with pop singer Michael Jackson to star in it.

== 1990s ==
=== Conversations with Vincent ===
Burton held a fascination with Vincent Price films since his childhood. He first worked with the actor on the 1982 short film Vincent, and a second collaboration on the 1983 television film Hansel and Gretel . During the production of Edward Scissorhands (1990), in which Price portrayed the inventor, Burton conceived the idea of making an independent documentary film on the actor, using the working title Conversations with Vincent. With self-financing from his own production company, Burton shot the film in black-and-white over a three-day period at the Vincent Price Gallery in East Los Angeles College in April 1991. In addition to Price, Roger Corman and Samuel Z. Arkoff were interviewed. Conversations with Vincent was stalled when Burton went to work on Batman Returns (1992), and after Price's death in October 1993. In December 1994, it was announced that Burton was returning to the hour-long documentary. Lucy Chase Williams, author of The Complete Films of Vincent Price, was working as a consultant. The film likely would have been released in the direct-to-video market, but the project was ultimately abandoned and remains unfinished.

=== Mai, the Psychic Girl ===
Beginning in the late 1980s, new wave rock band Sparks attempted to make the Japanese manga Mai, the Psychic Girl into a musical, with interest from Burton and Carolco Pictures, who purchased the film rights in August 1991. Carolco hoped Burton would start production in 1992, but he chose to work on The Nightmare Before Christmas and Ed Wood for Touchstone Pictures. The option on the film rights eventually expired, and Burton dropped out. Francis Ford Coppola later developed the property in the late 1990s. In June 2000, Sony Pictures Entertainment started on a different project with Kirk Wong attached to direct. By February 2001, a script had been written by Lisa Addario and Joey Syracuse for Sony's Columbia Pictures. The release of The Seduction of Ingmar Bergman, a radio musical by Sparks, in August 2009, was informed by the six years the band spent trying to get their Mai, the Psychic Girl produced. The album generated new interest, and gained a "second wind", vocalist Russell Mael explained. "The music is all ready and we are hoping that this still might see the light of day." On May 18, 2010, Burton expressed renewed interest in adapting the property.

=== Jurassic Park ===
Before Michael Crichton's novel Jurassic Park was published, Hollywood studios were highly interested in purchasing the film rights. This included Warner Bros. and Burton, Sony Pictures Entertainment and Richard Donner, and 20th Century Fox and Joe Dante. Universal Pictures acquired the rights in May 1990 for Steven Spielberg, resulting in the 1993 film adaptation.

=== Mary Reilly ===
Producers Jon Peters and Peter Guber acquired the film rights to Mary Reilly in 1989, and optioned them for Warner Bros. with Roman Polanski as director. When Guber became CEO of Sony Pictures Entertainment later that year, he moved Mary Reilly to Sony's sister company, TriStar Pictures, where Burton was approached to direct with Denise Di Novi to produce in 1991. Christopher Hampton was hired to write the screenplay, and Burton signed on as director in January 1993, after he approved over Hampton's rewrite. He intended to start filming in January 1994, after he completed Ed Wood, but Burton dropped out in May 1993 over his anger against Guber for putting Ed Wood in turnaround. Stephen Frears was TriStar's first choice to replace Burton, and Di Novi was fired and replaced with Ned Tanen. The film ended up becoming the critically and commercially unsuccessful Mary Reilly in 1996, starring Julia Roberts and John Malkovich.

=== Catwoman ===
"After the traumas of Batman Returns she has amnesia, and she doesn't really remember why she has all these bullet holes in her body, so she goes to relax in Oasisburg. What Gotham City is to New York City, Oasisburg is to Las Vegas-Los Angeles-Palm Springs. [It's a] resort area in the middle of the desert. It's run by superheroes, and the movie has great fun at making fun at the whole male superhero mythos. Then they end up being not very good at all deep down, and she's got to go back to that whole Catwoman thing."

— Daniel Waters on his script for Catwoman

Batman Returns would be the last film in the Warner Bros. Batman film series that featured Burton and Michael Keaton as director and leading actor. With Batman Forever, Warner Bros. decided to go in a "lighter" direction to be more mainstream in the process of a family film. Burton had no interest in returning to direct a sequel, but was credited as producer. With Warner Bros. moving on development for Batman Forever in June 1993, a Catwoman spin-off was announced. Michelle Pfeiffer was to reprise her role, with the character not to appear in Forever because of her own spin-off.

Burton became attached as director, while producer Denise Di Novi and writer Daniel Waters also returned. In January 1994, Burton was unsure of his plans to direct Catwoman or an adaptation of "The Fall of the House of Usher". On June 16, 1995, Waters turned in his Catwoman script to Warner Bros., the same day Batman Forever was released. Burton was still being courted to direct. Waters joked, "Turning it in the day Batman Forever opened may not have been my best logistical move, in that it's the celebration of the fun-for-the-whole-family Batman. Catwoman is definitely not a fun-for-the-whole-family script." In an August 1995 interview, Pfeiffer re-iterated her interest in the spin-off, but explained her priorities would be challenged as a mother and commitments to other projects. The film labored in development hell for years, with Pfeiffer replaced by Ashley Judd. The film ended up becoming the critically panned Catwoman (2004), starring Halle Berry.

=== Batman Continues ===
"I always hated those titles like Batman Forever. That sounds like a tattoo that somebody would get when they're on drugs or something. Or something some kid would write in the yearbook."

— Tim Burton

During the early development of the cancelled Catwoman spin-off, Burton expressed his interest in directing the third installment of the Batman film series that began with Batman in 1989, which would have been titled Batman Continues. But Warner Bros. was not interested in Tim Burton's return as director. Burton noted he was unsure about returning to direct, writing: "I don't think Warner Bros. wanted me to direct a third Batman. I even said that to them." Burton and Warner Bros. mutually agreed to part ways, though Burton would stay on as producer with Peter MacGregor-Scott. Warner Bros. was not happy with merchandise sales based on the second movie, they decided to change him and Burton put Joel Schumacher as the director of the third installment, leading to the release of Batman Forever, in which Burton was given top-billing producer credit, without being able to contribute ideas; only hiring director and screenplayers.

=== Cabin Boy ===
In 1993, Burton was set to direct Cabin Boy, but left to direct Ed Wood. Adam Resnick eventually directed the 1994 film, with Burton in a producer role.

=== Dennis the Menace ===
When Warner Bros. Pictures agreed to produce Dennis the Menace in 1993, Production President Terry Semel wanted Burton to direct. The executive producer Ernest Chambers refused and instead hired John Hughes as a writer and producer based on his work with the Home Alone films.

=== The Fall of the House of Usher ===
In 1994, Burton was close to directing an adaptation of the Edgar Allan Poe short story "The Fall of the House of Usher" with a screenplay by Jonathan Gems; he chose to direct Mars Attacks! instead.

=== The Hawkline Monster ===
Burton was to direct The Hawkline Monster, a western/monster film that was to star Clint Eastwood and Jack Nicholson, with a screenplay by Jonathan Gems; he chose to direct Mars Attacks! instead.

=== Go Baby Go ===
Burton considered directing Go Baby Go, a beach film in the style of filmmaker Russ Meyer, with a screenplay by Jonathan Gems. The screenplay was about three go-go dancers who after exposed to toxic chemicals, become 50 feet tall and rampage across several beaches in California. Burton and Gems left the project after they learned HBO was remaking Attack of the 50 Foot Woman. Burton would go on to direct Mars Attacks! which was written by Gems.

=== Geek Love ===
Burton bought the rights to Geek Love by Katherine Dunn in the 1990s. The story, about a traveling circus that uses chemicals to create genuine freaks, seemed perfect for Burton, but there has been no word about it since. In an interview with Dunn, she stated, "He's got the rights. That's half the battle right there. Though it no longer seems like something he'd do. It's a little too horror for him now in my opinion. Though I would love to see this film get made."

=== Weird Tales television series ===
In 1995, Burton was reportedly set to collaborate with directors Oliver Stone and Francis Ford Coppola on an anthology series for HBO based on Weird Tales, a collection of horror short stories written by the likes of H. P. Lovecraft, Ray Bradbury and Robert Bloch. Burton was to executive produce and direct one of three episodes in a 90-minute pilot.

=== Dinosaurs Attack! ===
Around 1995, writer Jonathan Gems wrote a screenplay for a film adaptation of Dinosaurs Attack!, with Burton as director. However, both Burton and Gems came to the conclusion that the project was too similar to Jurassic Park.

=== Superman Lives ===
After Kevin Smith had been hired to rewrite a script called Superman Reborn, he suggested Burton to direct. It was Smith who convinced Warner Bros. to change the title to Superman Lives. Burton signed on with a pay-or-play contract of $5 million and Warner Bros. set a theatrical release date for the summer of 1998, the 60th anniversary of the character's debut in Action Comics. Nicolas Cage was signed on to play Superman, with a $20 million pay-or-play contract, believing he could "reconceive the character". Producer Jon Peters felt Cage could "convince audiences he [Superman] came from outer space." Burton explained Cage's casting would be "the first time you would believe that nobody could recognize Clark Kent as Superman, he [Cage] could physically change his persona." Kevin Spacey was approached for the role of Lex Luthor (a role he would eventually play in 2006' film Superman Returns), while Christopher Walken (who worked before with Burton in Batman Returns portraying Max Shreck) was Burton's choice for Brainiac, a role also considered for Jim Carrey (who portrayed Riddler in Batman Forever) and Gary Oldman (who would portray Jim Gordon in The Dark Knight trilogy). Sandra Bullock, Courteney Cox and Julianne Moore had been approached for Lois Lane, while Chris Rock was cast as Jimmy Olsen. Michael Keaton confirmed his involvement, but when asked if he would be reprising his role as Batman from Burton's Batman films, he would only reply, "Not exactly."

Burton immediately hired Wesley Strick to write a completely different story about the death and return of Superman. The film entered pre-production in June 1997. Filming was originally set to begin in early 1998. Burton chose Pittsburgh, Pennsylvania as his primary filming location for Metropolis, while start dates for filming were pushed back. For budgetary reasons also of following the critical and financial failure of 1997 film Batman & Robin, Warner Bros. ordered another rewrite from Dan Gilroy, delayed the film and ultimately put it on hold in April 1998. Burton then left to direct Sleepy Hollow. Burton has depicted the experience as a difficult one, citing differences with producer Jon Peters and the studio, stating, "I basically wasted a year. A year is a long time to be working with somebody that you don't really want to be working with."

=== Goosebumps ===
When the Goosebumps film was in early production and was going to be made by 20th Century Fox and DreamWorks, Burton was originally going to produce it in 1998, with the option to direct. However, the project fell through and was later sold to Sony Pictures Entertainment, resulting in the 2015 film directed by Rob Letterman and composed by Tim's friend Danny Elfman.

=== X: The Man with the X-ray Eyes ===
Burton developed a script for a remake of the 1963 science fiction B-film X: The Man with the X-ray Eyes with writer Bryan Goluboff, but it went unproduced.

=== Black Sunday ===
Around this time, Burton considered directing a remake of the 1960 Italian horror film Black Sunday.

== 2000s ==
=== Batman: The Musical ===
In 2002, Burton, Jim Steinman, and David Ives had worked on a theatre production called Batman: The Musical. Steinman has revealed five songs from the musical. The first is the opening theme for "Gotham City" and the entry of Batman with his tortured solo "The Graveyard Shift"; followed by "The Joker's Song (Where Does He Get All Those Wonderful Toys?)", "The Catwoman's Song (I Need All The Love I Can Get)", "We're Still The Children We Once Were" (the climactic sequence) and "In The Land Of The Pig The Butcher Is King", sung by the corrupt blood-suckers ruling Gotham, covered on the Meat Loaf album Bat Out of Hell III: The Monster Is Loose. After production was cancelled, these songs were released on the Batman: The Musical memorial site.

=== Charlie and the Chocolate Factory musical ===
During production on the film Charlie and the Chocolate Factory, a Broadway musical was planned to accompany it. The studio and Burton reiterated their interest in May 2003, however, the project was cancelled by the time the film was released.

=== Ripley's Believe It or Not! ===
During the mid-2000s, Burton was scheduled to direct a film based on the famous Ripley's Believe It or Not! franchise, with Jim Carrey portraying Robert Ripley and a script by Ed Wood scribes Scott Alexander and Larry Karaszewski; the film ran over budget however, and was shelved by Paramount Pictures. Burton moved on to direct Sweeney Todd: The Demon Barber of Fleet Street, and on October 23, 2008, Chris Columbus took over the Ripley's Believe It or Not! film, with Carrey still portraying Ripley, and on January 12, 2011, it was reported that Eric Roth will write a new script.

== 2010s ==
=== Maleficent ===
In January 2010, it was announced that after Dark Shadows, Burton's next project would be Maleficent, a Wicked-like film that showed the origin and the past of Sleeping Beauty's antagonist Maleficent. In an interview with Fandango published February 23, 2010, however, Burton denied he was directing any upcoming Sleeping Beauty film. However, on November 23, 2010, in an interview with MTV, Burton confirmed that he was indeed putting together a script for Maleficent. It was announced by The Hollywood Reporter on May 16, 2011, that Burton was no longer attached to Maleficent.

=== The Addams Family stop-motion animated film ===
In March 2010, it was announced that Illumination Entertainment in partnership with Universal Pictures, had acquired the underlying rights to the Addams Family drawings. The film was planned to be a stop-motion animated film based on Charles Addams' original drawings. Burton was set to direct and co-produce, with Ed Wood writers Scott Alexander and Larry Karaszewski scripting. In July 2013, it was reported that the film was cancelled when Universal and Illumination lost the rights. On October 31, 2013, it was announced in Variety that MGM would be reviving The Addams Family as a CGI animated film with Pamela Pettler to write the screenplay and Andrew Mittman and Kevin Miserocchi to executive produce the film and were in final negotiations with BermanBraun's Gail Berman and Lloyd Braun to produce. By October 2017, Conrad Vernon had been hired to direct the film, which he will also produce along with Berman and Alex Schwartz, based on a screenplay written by Pettler, with revisions by Matt Lieberman. The film turned into the critically panned The Addams Family that was released on October 11, 2019. Burton would eventually return to the property in 2020, helping to develop Wednesday with Miles Millar and Alfred Gough as showrunners.

=== Monsterpocalypse ===
In May 2010, DreamWorks announced that it had acquired the rights to a film adaptation of Monsterpocalypse, a Kaiju-themed collectible miniatures game. The studio had approached Burton for the project. On July 19, 2010, it was confirmed that Burton was attached to direct, but the film went unproduced partly due to Guillermo del Toro making his own Kaiju film called Pacific Rim in 2013. However, on May 3, 2016, Warner Bros acquired the project and hired Fede Álvarez to direct and co-write the film with Rodo Sayagues.

=== Alice in Wonderland musical ===
Stage adaptation Walt Disney Theatrical was in early talks with Burton and screenwriter Linda Woolverton to develop Alice in Wonderland as a Broadway musical. Woolverton authored the screenplay for Disney's The Lion King and is also the Tony Award-nominated book writer of Beauty and the Beast, Aida, and Lestat. Burton would have also rendered the overall designs for the stage musical. Woolverton would have adapted her screenplay for the stage production. Direction and choreography would have been done by Rob Ashford. The musical was aiming to make its world-premiere in London.

=== The Hunchback of Notre-Dame ===
In March 2011, it was announced that Burton was attached to direct a film of The Hunchback of Notre-Dame, which was supposed to feature and be co-produced by Josh Brolin, but the film has been scrapped.

=== Dark Shadows sequel ===
On December 7, 2011, Pfeiffer told MTV that she is hoping sequels will be made for the film. On May 8, 2012, Variety reported that Warner Bros. may want to turn Dark Shadows into a film franchise. On May 18, 2012, Collider mentioned that the ending of Dark Shadows lends itself to a possible sequel. When Burton was asked if he thought that this could be a possible start to a franchise, he replied, "No. Because of the nature of it being like a soap opera, that was the structure. It wasn't a conscious decision. First of all, it's a bit presumptuous to think that. If something works out, that's one thing, but you can't ever predict that. The ending had more to do with the soap opera structure of it."

=== Pinocchio ===
Robert Downey Jr. enlisted Burton to direct a Warner Bros. retelling of The Adventures of Pinocchio in 2012. Burton pursued Big Eyes and Ben Stiller was attached to direct.

=== Miss Peregrine's Home for Peculiar Children sequels ===
On September 30, 2016, Burton's adaptation of Miss Peregrine's Home for Peculiar Children was released, leading to speculation that the sequel novels (Hollow City and Library of Souls) would be adapted as well. However, due to the mediocre box office returns of Peculiar Children, talks of a sequel were scrapped.

== 2020s ==
=== Untitled Paul Reubens project ===
On September 9, 2023, Burton commented to The Independent that he had "a weird idea" for another project with Paul Reubens in what would have been their fourth collaboration after working together in Pee-wee's Big Adventure, Batman Returns and The Nightmare Before Christmas. The idea was naturally dropped following Reubens' unexpected death on July 30, 2023.

=== Attack of the 50 Foot Woman ===
In February 2024, Variety reported that Burton and Gone Girl writer Gillian Flynn were developing a remake of the 1958 science fiction classic Attack of the 50 Foot Woman for Warner Bros. However, in November, Burton would downplay his involvement in the film, stating he had no projects at that moment. By June 2025, Margot Robbie was in early talks to produce and star in the project via her production company LuckyChap Entertainment. In August, Robbie's involvement was confirmed, and Flynn was reported to have exited due to other commitments after writing a first draft of the script. In 2026, Danya Jimenez and Hannah McMechan were brought on to rewrite the screenplay.

=== Beetlejuice Beetlejuice Beetlejuice ===
Though Beetlejuice Beetlejuice cast members seemed enthusiastic about a potential third film to be titled Beetlejuice Beetlejuice Beetlejuice, Burton said in August 2024: "Let's do the math ... it took 35 years to do this, so I'll be over 100. But I guess it's possible with the advent of science these days, but I don't think so", referencing the long gap between the sequel and the original Beetlejuice film. However, in April the following year, a third Beetlejuice was reported to be in the works with Burton back to direct.

=== Untitled animated film ===
In a June 2025 interview with Mexican outlet Milenio, Burton revealed he was currently working on an animated feature and awaiting the script for it. At the Cannes Film Festival in May 2026, Burton met with potential backers for the project, which was described as "top-secret". In August, Deadline reported that Burton would direct from an original screenplay written by Kazuo Ishiguro, with multiple sources claiming the story to be set in post-WWII Japan. Ishiguro told Variety, "genre-wise, it's hard to pin down, but it’s a Tim Burton movie."

=== Medusa ===
In July 2025, James Hibberd of The Hollywood Reporter mentioned Burton's involvement in a Medusa film set up at Sony Pictures. The director neither confirmed nor denied the project, responding, "I don't talk about anything until I'm doing it," and cited past experiences with cancelled projects as "soul destroying moment[s]."

== Offers ==
=== Big Top Pee-wee ===
After the 1985 film, Burton was offered the opportunity to direct Big Top Pee-wee, but had no interest and was already working on his own pet project, Beetlejuice.

=== Hot to Trot ===
After the success of Pee-wee's Big Adventure (1985), and before his hiring of Beetlejuice (1988), Warner Bros. sent Burton various scripts. He was disheartened by their lack of imagination and originality, one of them being Hot to Trot (1988).

=== The Addams Family ===
During pre-production of The Addams Family (1991), Burton was considered and approached to direct the film by producer Scott Rudin, but was unable to accept the position due to his commitment to Batman Returns. Filmmaker Terry Gilliam was then approached, but also turned it down, before Barry Sonnenfeld ultimately accepted.

=== Stay Tuned ===
Morgan Creek Productions originally wanted Burton to direct Stay Tuned because of his work on Beetlejuice and his art style, but Burton left the project to direct Batman Returns, the sequel to his 1989 Batman film, and was replaced by Peter Hyams while having some of the art styles paying tribute to Burton.

=== How the Grinch Stole Christmas ===
During pre-production of How the Grinch Stole Christmas, before Ron Howard's involvement, Tim Burton was approached to direct but turned down the offer due to a scheduling conflict with Sleepy Hollow.

=== Pirates of the Caribbean: Dead Men Tell No Tales ===
In June 2011, it was reported that Burton was being considered to be selected as the director for Pirates of the Caribbean: Dead Men Tell No Tales, the fifth installment of the Pirates of the Caribbean film series, but he chose to direct Frankenweenie.

== Producer only ==
=== Toots and the Upside Down House ===
In 1996, when Burton was the CEO and founder of Walt Disney Animation Studios' stop-motion studio division Skellington Productions, he was going to produce the studio's planned third film, Toots and the Upside Down House, that was based on the book by Carol Hughes where a young girl still grieving over the death of her mother goes to a fantasy world inside her home when her dad still won't pay attention to her, where goblins, fairies and sprites live while helping the fairies battle an evil Jack Frost. Burton was attached to produce it, while Henry Selick was set to direct it (marking the third collaboration between Selick and Burton), with the screenplay written by Steven Soderbergh and co-produced by Disney's film partner at the time Miramax, which would have made it the first original animated film made by the company. However, Disney shut down the film's production, along with Skellington Productions, after the poor box office results of James and the Giant Peach.

=== Tim Burton's Lost in Oz ===
Tim Burton's Lost in Oz would be a television series based on L. Frank Baum's The Wizard of Oz book series. Burton would be its executive producer. A pilot episode was filmed in 2000, but the series became unproduced due to budget constraints.

=== The Nightmare Before Christmas 2 ===
In 2001, The Walt Disney Company began to consider producing a sequel to The Nightmare Before Christmas, but rather than using stop motion, Disney wanted to use computer animation. Burton convinced Disney to drop the idea. "I was always very protective of Nightmare not to do sequels or things of that kind," Burton explained. "You know, 'Jack visits Thanksgiving world' or other kinds of things just because I felt the movie had a purity to it and the people that like it... Because it's a mass-market kind of thing, it was important to kind of keep that purity of it."

In 2009, Selick said he would do a film sequel if he and Burton could create a good story for it. In February 2019, it was reported that a new Nightmare Before Christmas film was in the works, with Disney considering either a stop-motion sequel or live-action remake. In October 2019, Chris Sarandon expressed interest on reprising his role as Jack Skellington if a sequel film ever materializes.

=== 9 sequel ===
In an interview with 9 director Shane Acker: "I think there is definitely room. I mean, the way we end the film, there is a slight suggestion that it may be a new beginning. And I think we could continue the journey from where we left off and see how these creatures are existing in a world in which the natural environment is coming back and perhaps even threatening them in some way. Do they make the decision to not affect it, or do they try to affect it in some way? And do they still try to hold on to that humanity within them or do they recognize themselves at being machines too and go off on a different trajectory? So there's lots of idea that I think that we could play with and make another story out of."

No plans for a sequel have been made, but possibilities were mentioned via the film's 2009 DVD commentary. Director Acker has also mentioned the possibility of a sequel being made because of the lack of darker animated films, claiming that everything is G- and PG-rated with little to no dark elements. In 2009 he said that he will continue to make darker animated films, either doing so with a sequel to 9 or original ideas for future films. Before the theatrical release of the film, Acker and Tim Burton stated they were open for a sequel, depending on how well the film was received. Since the film's home release, there have been no further mentions of a sequel, with Acker focusing on projects announced in 2012 (Deep) and 2013 (Beasts of Burden), neither of which have been released as of December 2017.

=== Deep ===
On June 11, 2012, Shane Acker confirmed that Burton would work with Valve to create his next animated feature film, Deep. Like 9, the film will take place in a post-apocalyptic world (although set in a different universe). Deep would have been another darker animated film, as Shane Acker has expressed his interest in creating more PG-13 animated films. Since then, there has been no further announcements. However, despite the silence from Acker, in January 2017, the Facebook profile of the character "the Scientist" was updated with a rather cryptic message. The profile had been inactive since 2009, leading some to speculate the teasing of a sequel.

=== The Last American Vampire ===
On June 22, 2012, Abraham Lincoln: Vampire Hunter, based on novel of the same name, was released to theaters, with Timur Bekmambetov as director and Burton in a producing role, leading to speculation that the sequel book The Last American Vampire would be adapted as well. However, due to the film bombing in the box office and poor critical receptions, talks of a sequel were stalled. In October 2018, it was announced that NBC had given a "script commitment plus penalty" to a television adaptation of the novel from author Seth Grahame-Smith, David Katzenberg, Terry Matalas, and 20th Century Fox Television. Matalas would write the series and executive-produce alongside Grahame-Smith and Katzenberg. It was to be on Quibi, but with the shuttering of the streaming service in December 2020, development on the show ceased.

== See also ==
- Tim Burton filmography

== Bibliography ==
- Hanke, Ken (1999). Tim Burton: An Unauthorized Biography of the Filmmaker. Los Angeles: Renaissance Books. ISBN 1580631622.
- Salisbury, Mark; Burton, Tim (2000). Burton on Burton. Faber and Faber. ISBN 0571205070.
- Salisbury, Mark; Burton, Tim (2006). Burton on Burton. London: Faber and Faber. ISBN 0571229263.
