= Luau (short film) =

1984 film by Tim Burton

- Directed by: Tim Burton; Jerry Rees
- Screenplay by: Tim Burton; Jerry Rees
- Produced by: Tim Burton; Jerry Rees
- Starring: Mike Gabriel; Joe Ranft; John Musker; Terrey Hamada; Tim Burton; Susan Frankenberger; Jerry Rees; Phil Young
- Cinematography: Randy Cartwright
- Music by: Kent Holaday
- Release date: April 3, 1982
- Running time: 31 minutes
- Country: United States
- Language: English

Luau is a 1982 short film written and directed by Tim Burton and Jerry Rees while Burton was working in Walt Disney Animation, with several animators and other employees from Disney making appearances. The short film is a parody of beach films from the early 1960s.

== Plot ==
One sunny day Bob decides to break up with his girlfriend Arlene in favor of Princess Yakamoshi, who is staying with Arlene for the summer. That night Bob takes the princess to a luau, where he is pushed into the pool by Arlene. The disembodied head of an alien crashes the party and is largely ignored until he challenges Bob to a surfing contest. If the alien wins, he gets Bob's body and if he loses, he will take the body of an oafish partygoer named I.Q.. Meanwhile, another partygoer known as Kahuna decides to leave the group as he does not like Bob's chances of winning and furthermore no longer wants to be known as the Kahuna or party. Throughout the rest of the short the narrator mentions people having Kahuna sightings throughout the United States.

The alien loses the contest but chooses to try and kill Bob and the others anyway. Arlene and the princess begin to fight as a nearby group of business people holding a meeting on the beach grow angry at the constant noise and interruptions. They decide to construct a building on top of the beach and luau spot, which the partygoers protest. A fight breaks out between the two groups and Arlene and Bob begin strangling one another. The fight is interrupted by an older woman named Rosalie, who urges them to come inside as the nearby volcano is about to erupt. Arlene and Bob make up. I.Q. sits down to watch TV and sees the Kahuna on one show. He calls out to the Kahuna, who insists that his name is Vladmir Moonface Jr.

== Cast ==
- Mike Gabriel as Bob
- Tim Burton as The Supreme Being/Mortie
- Joe Ranft as I.Q.
- Susan Frankenberger as Arlene
- Terrey Hamada as Princess Yakamoshi
- Jerry Rees as Surfer
- John Musker as Surfer
- Phil Young as Kahuna/Vladmir Moonface Jr.
- Randy Cartwright as Bartender
- Darrell Van Citters as Partygoer
- Harry Sabin as Surfer
- Susan Kroyer as Businessman
- Ben Burgess as Businessman

John Lasseter, John Debney, Butch Hartman and Tad Stones makes uncredited appearances.

== Production ==
Luau was produced during Tim Burton's early years working as an animator in Walt Disney Animation Studios. In an interview Rick Heinrichs stated that Burton and the other animators were often frustrated by the requirements and limitations of the studio and that the short was "a great pressure relief valve for everyone away from the factory line." The short was created as a parody of surf films. Super-8 film was used during the production and much of the dialogue was adlibbed.

== Release ==
Luau was produced independently and did not receive a public release until either 2010, when portions of it screened at the Tim Burton retrospective at the Museum of Modern Art in New York City. The full short would later screen at the Max Ernst Museum in Brühl (Baden) during the The World of Tim Burton exhibition in 2015.

In 2025, Randy Cartwright released a remastered version of the short film in his YouTube channel.

== Reception ==
Samuel L. Umland noted that Luau was "A film of inspired silliness" and was a "gentle parody of the teenager stereotypes" displayed in beach party movies such as Gidget. Neil O'Brien called the film "as irreverent and politically incorrect as many 1980s comedies, with the production value of an Ed Wood z movie."
