= Stalk of the Celery Monster =

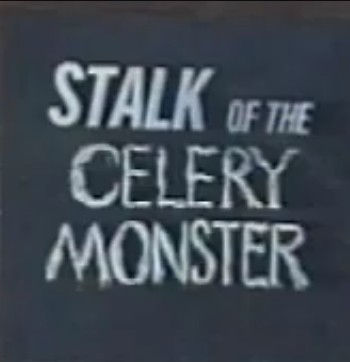
- Stalk of the celery monster
- Directed by: Tim Burton
- Story by: Tim Burton
- Produced by: Tim Burton; Brett R. Thompson
- Starring: Tim Burton as Maxwell Payne Ralph Votrian
- Production company: California Institute of the Arts
- Release date: August 30, 1979
- Running time: 1.5 minutes
- Country: United States
- Language: English

Stalk of the Celery Monster is a 1979 short animated film written, directed and animated entirely in pencil by Tim Burton during his time as a student with the California Institute of the Arts. The film caused such a stir among his class that it attracted the attention of the Walt Disney Animation Studios, who offered young Burton an animator's apprenticeship at their studio.

== Plot ==
A mad scientist and his assistant are working but he is really a dentist.

== Preservation status ==
It was shot on 8 mm film and for much time it was considered to be lost, until fragments of it were shown in 2006 on Spanish television. Currently, the excerpts of the film are archived at the Library of Congress.

== See also ==
- List of incomplete or partially lost films
