= The Island of Doctor Agor =

- Directed by: Tim Burton
- Written by: Story: H. G. Wells; Adaptation & screenplay: Tim Burton
- Release date: 1971
- Country: United States
- Language: English

The Island of Doctor Agor is a 1971 American short animated film written and directed by then-thirteen-year-old Tim Burton, who also starred in the title role of Doctor Agor. The short is one of Burton's first animated films, and was adapted by Burton from the H. G. Wells 1896 novel The Island of Doctor Moreau.

The film starred Burton's friends and classmates and was shot with a Super 8 camera, utilizing locations such as the LA Zoo's animal cages and beaches in Malibu.

== Plot ==
A lonesome fisherman becomes shipwrecked on a remote island owned and operated by a strange scientist.

== Cast ==
- Tim Burton – Doctor Agor

== Response ==
Though the film was written about by Nancy Kilpatrick in the 2004 book The Goth Bible, in the 2005 book The Films of Tim Burton, author Alison McMahan concluded that because of the timing of an April 1 posting of an IMDb comment, the film listing is "likely" a joke.

However, in the 2006 book Burton on Burton, Burton himself specifically speaks of the film when recounting his early days making Super 8 films.
