= Tim Burton =

American filmmaker (born 1958)

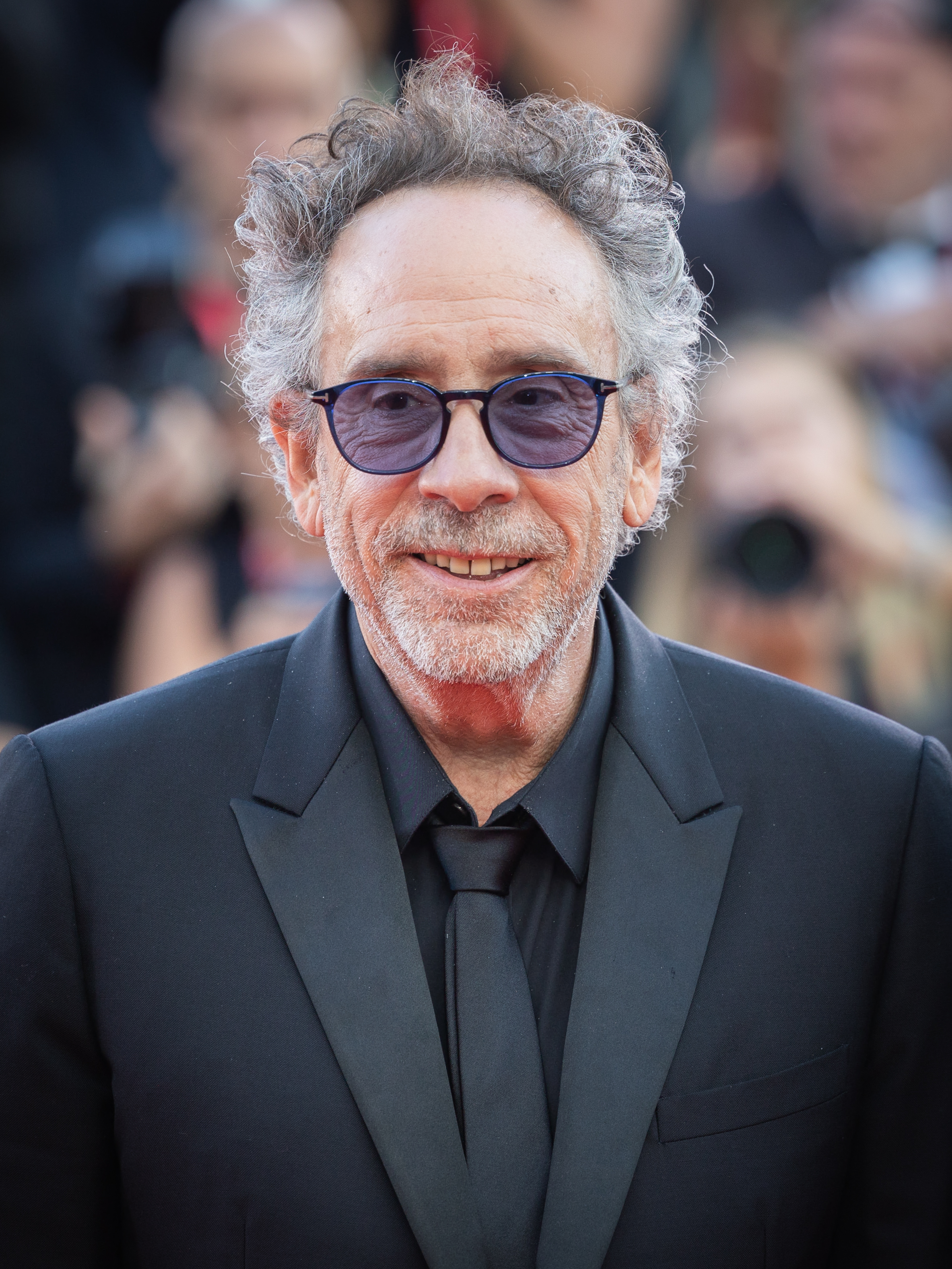
- Burton in 2024
- Born: Timothy Walter Burton; August 25, 1958 (age 68); Burbank, California, U.S.
- Occupations: Film director; producer; screenwriter; animator
- Years active: 1971–present
- Notable work: Filmography
- Spouse: Lena Gieseke (m. 1987; div. 1991)
- Partner(s): Lisa Marie (1992–2001); Helena Bonham Carter (2001–2014); Monica Bellucci (2022–2025)
- Children: 2
- Website: timburton.com

Timothy Walter Burton (born August 25, 1958) is an American filmmaker and animator. He is known for pioneering Goth subculture in Hollywood, with his films employing a distinctive style that blends Gothic horror and dark fantasy aesthetics with whimsical and surreal elements. He has received numerous accolades, including one Emmy Award and nominations for two Academy Awards, a Golden Globe Award, and three BAFTA Awards. He was honored with the Venice International Film Festival's Golden Lion for Lifetime Achievement in 2007 and France's Order of Arts and Letters in 2010.

Burton made his directorial debut with the comedy film Pee-wee's Big Adventure (1985) and gained wider prominence for directing Beetlejuice (1988) and Edward Scissorhands (1990), as well as producing The Nightmare Before Christmas (1993), which was based on a poem he wrote. He directed films spanning a variety of genres such as animation, drama, fantasy, musical, science fiction, and horror; among them are Batman (1989), Batman Returns (1992), Ed Wood (1994), Mars Attacks! (1996), Sleepy Hollow (1999), Big Fish (2003), Charlie and the Chocolate Factory (2005), Corpse Bride (2005), Sweeney Todd: The Demon Barber of Fleet Street (2007), Alice in Wonderland (2010), Frankenweenie (2012), Big Eyes (2014), Miss Peregrine's Home for Peculiar Children (2016), and Beetlejuice Beetlejuice (2024).

His work in television includes directing several episodes of the Netflix series Wednesday (2022–present), for which he was nominated for the Primetime Emmy Award for Outstanding Directing for a Comedy Series. He frequently collaborates with musician Danny Elfman, who has scored all but three of his films. He has also released several books such as The Melancholy Death of Oyster Boy & Other Stories (1997).

== Early life ==
Timothy Walter Burton (Note: Burton's middle name is cited as Walter by the Museum of Modern Art on its web appearance for a 2009 exhibition on his artwork and a book covering his career as an artist and filmmaker, though it is cited as William by other sources, such as the Tim Burton Collective.) was born in Burbank, California, on August 25, 1958, the son of Jean (née Erickson), who later owned a cat-themed gift shop, and William "Bill" Burton, a former minor league baseball player who worked for the Burbank Parks and Recreation Department. The baseball field at Burbank's Olive Recreation Center is named for Bill.

As a preteen, Burton made short films in his backyard, using crude stop motion animation techniques or shooting on 8 mm film without sound; one of his oldest known films, The Island of Doctor Agor, is an adaptation of the H. G. Wells novel The Island of Doctor Moreau which he made when he was 13 years old. He attended Providencia Elementary School, Luther Burbank Middle School, and Burbank High School, but was not a particularly good student. He played on the water polo team at Burbank High. After graduating in 1976, he attended the California Institute of the Arts in Valencia, Santa Clarita, studying character animation until 1979. As a student there, he made the short films Stalk of the Celery Monster and King and Octopus.

Burton was an introspective person who found pleasure in artwork, drawing, painting, and watching movies. His future work would be heavily influenced by the books of such childhood heroes as Dr. Seuss and Roald Dahl and the aesthetics of silent Gothic horror films, Universal Monsters films such as Frankenstein (to which he would continuously pay homage throughout his career), Hammer Horror films starring Christopher Lee, and the horror films of Vincent Price; the latter two would both later star in his films, with Price being honored in his short film Vincent (1982). In a Hollywood Reporter article, Burton said, "I grew up watching the Universal horror movies, Japanese monster movies, and pretty much any kind of monster movie. That was my genre." He also said that his love of Ray Harryhausen's work got him interested in stop-motion animation at a young age.

== Career ==
=== 1981–1987: Early work and breakthrough ===
Stalk of the Celery Monster attracted the attention of Walt Disney Productions, who offered Burton an animator's apprenticeship at its animation division. He worked as an animator, storyboard artist, graphic designer, art director, and concept artist on films such as The Fox and the Hound (1981), Tron (1982), and The Black Cauldron (1985). His concept art never made it into the finished films.

While at Disney in 1982, Burton made his first short, Vincent, a six-minute black-and-white stop motion film based on a poem written by Burton, which depicts a young boy who fantasizes that he is his hero Vincent Price, with Price himself providing narration. The film was produced by Rick Heinrichs, whom Burton had befriended while working in the concept art department at Disney. The film was shown at the Chicago Film Festival and released, alongside the teen drama Tex, for two weeks in one Los Angeles cinema. This was followed by Burton's first live-action production, Hansel and Gretel, a Japanese-themed adaptation of the Brothers Grimm fairy tale for the Disney Channel, which climaxes in a kung fu fight between Hansel and Gretel and the witch. Having aired once in 1983 at 10:30 P.M. on Halloween and promptly shelved, prints of the film are extremely difficult to locate, fueling rumors that the project did not exist. The short would finally go on public display in 2009 at the Museum of Modern Art, and again in 2011 as part of the Tim Burton art exhibit at LACMA. It was again shown at the Seoul Museum of Art in 2012.

Burton's next live-action short film, Frankenweenie, was released in 1984. It tells the story of a young boy who tries to revive his dog after it is run over by a car. Filmed in black-and-white, it stars Barret Oliver, Shelley Duvall (with whom he would work again in 1986, directing an episode of her television series Faerie Tale Theatre), and Daniel Stern. After Frankenweenie was completed, Disney fired Burton, under the pretext of him spending the company's resources on a film that would be too dark and scary for children to see.

Actor Paul Reubens saw Frankenweenie and chose Burton to direct the cinematic spin-off of his popular character Pee-wee Herman, stating on the audio commentary of 2000 DVD release of Pee-wee's Big Adventure that as soon as the short began, he was sold on Burton's style. Pee-wee Herman gained mainstream popularity with a successful stage show at The Groundlings and the Roxy which was later turned into an HBO special. The film, Pee-wee's Big Adventure, was made on a budget of $8 million and grossed more than $40 million at the North American box office. Burton, a fan of the eccentric musical group Oingo Boingo, asked songwriter Danny Elfman to provide the music for the film. Since then, Elfman has scored every film that Tim Burton has directed, except for Ed Wood, Sweeney Todd: The Demon Barber of Fleet Street, and Miss Peregrine's Home for Peculiar Children.

In 1987, Burton contributed to the animated Family Dog episode of the Steven Spielberg-created anthology series Amazing Stories. Written and directed by fellow Disney colleague and future The Iron Giant (1999) and The Incredibles (2004) director Brad Bird, the episode followed the misadventures of a dog through his point of view as he encounters various shenanigans with the family that owns him. Burton would be responsible for handling character designs (which were reminiscent of the designs of Sparky from Frankenweenie), and his longtime collaborator Elfman additionally provided music for the episode. In 1993, Family Dog would be spun off into its own series with Spielberg and Burton executive producing, though Bird had zero involvement; the series only lasted a single season on CBS and was burned off in the summer of that year.

Additionally, Burton directed episodes of the 1985 revival of the '50s/'60s anthology horror series Alfred Hitchcock Presents and Shelley Duvall's Faerie Tale Theatre.

=== 1988–1994: Batman films and acclaim ===
Burton's next major film was Beetlejuice (1988), a supernatural comedy horror about a young couple forced to cope with life after death and the family of pretentious yuppies who invade their treasured New England home. Their teenage daughter, Lydia (Winona Ryder), has an obsession with death which allows her to see the deceased couple. Starring Alec Baldwin and Geena Davis, and featuring Michael Keaton as the title character, the film grossed $80 million on a relatively low budget and won the Academy Award for Best Makeup. It was later adapted into an animated TV series of the same name, with Burton playing a role as executive producer, that ran on ABC and later the Fox network.

Burton's ability to produce hit films with low budgets impressed studio executives, and he received his first big-budget film, Batman. The production was plagued with problems. Burton repeatedly clashed with the film's producers, Jon Peters and Peter Guber, but the most notable debacle involved casting. For the title role, Burton chose to cast Michael Keaton as Batman following their previous collaboration in Beetlejuice, despite Keaton's average physique, inexperience with action films, and reputation as a comic actor. Although Burton won in the end, the furor over the casting provoked enormous fan animosity, to the extent that Warner Brothers' share price slumped. Burton had considered it ridiculous to cast a "bulked-up" ultra-masculine man as Batman, insisting that Batman should be an ordinary man who dressed up in an elaborate bat costume to frighten criminals. Burton originally considered Brad Dourif for the Joker, but eventually cast Jack Nicholson, in a move that helped assuage fans' fears, as well as attracting older audiences not as interested in a superhero film. When the film opened in June 1989, it was backed by the biggest marketing and merchandising campaign in film history at the time, and became one of the biggest box office hits of all time, grossing over $250 million in the U.S. and $400 million worldwide (numbers not adjusted for inflation) and earning critical acclaim for the performances of both Keaton and Nicholson, as well as the film's production aspects, which won the Academy Award for Best Art Direction. The success of the film helped establish Burton as a profitable director, and it proved to be a huge influence on future superhero films, which eschewed the bright, all-American heroism of Richard Donner's Superman for a grittier, more realistic look and characters with more psychological depth. It also served as a major inspiration for the acclaimed TV series Batman: The Animated Series.

Burton claimed that the graphic novel Batman: The Killing Joke was a major influence on his film adaptation of Batman:

I was never a giant comic book fan, but I've always loved the image of Batman and the Joker. The reason I've never been a comic book fan – and I think it started when I was a child – is because I could never tell which box I was supposed to read. I don't know if it was dyslexia or whatever, but that's why I loved The Killing Joke, because, for the first time, I could tell which one to read. It's my favorite. It's the first comic I've ever loved. And the success of those graphic novels made our ideas more acceptable.

In 1990, Burton created a unique drawing which gave screenwriter Caroline Thompson inspiration to write the script for Edward Scissorhands which Burton directed, re-uniting with Winona Ryder from Beetlejuice. His friend Johnny Depp, a teen idol at the end of the 1980s due primarily to his work on the hit TV series 21 Jump Street, was cast in the title role of Edward, who was the creation of an eccentric and old-fashioned inventor (played by Vincent Price in one of his last screen appearances). Edward looked human, but was left with scissors in the place of hands due to the untimely death of his creator. Set in suburbia (and shot in Land o' Lakes, Florida), the film is largely seen as Burton's autobiography of his childhood in Burbank. Burton's idea for the character of Edward Scissorhands came from a drawing he created in high school. Depp wrote a similar comment in the foreword to Mark Salisbury's book, Burton on Burton, regarding his first meeting with Burton over the casting of the film. Edward Scissorhands is considered one of Burton's best movies by some critics. Burton has stated that this is his most personal and meaningful film because it is a representation of him not being able to communicate effectively with others as a teenager.

After the success of Batman, Burton agreed to direct the sequel for Warner Bros. on the condition that he would be granted total control. The result was Batman Returns, which featured Michael Keaton returning as Batman, and a new triad of villains: Danny DeVito (as the Penguin), Michelle Pfeiffer (as Catwoman) and Christopher Walken (as Max Shreck, an evil corporate tycoon and original character created for the film). Somewhat darker and considerably more personal than its predecessor, concerns were raised that the film might be too scary for children. Audiences were more uncomfortable at the film's overt sexuality, personified by the sleek, fetish-inspired styling of Catwoman's costume. Burton made many changes to the Penguin which would subsequently be applied to the character in both comics and television. In the comics, the Penguin was an ordinary man; in the film, the Penguin resembles his namesake, possessing webbed, flipper-like fingers, a hooked, beak-like nose, and a short, rotund body. Burton also chose the artist who recorded the single for the movie soundtrack; he insisted that it be the band Siouxsie and the Banshees with the song "Face to Face". Released in 1992, Batman Returns grossed $282.8 million worldwide, making it a financial success, though not to the extent of its predecessor.

Due to schedule constraints on Batman Returns, Burton produced, but did not direct, The Nightmare Before Christmas (1993) for Disney, originally meant to be a children's book in rhyme. The film was directed by Henry Selick and written by Caroline Thompson, based on Burton's original story, world, and characters. The film received positive reviews for the stop motion animation, musical score, and original storyline. It was a modest box office success, grossing $50 million. Because of the nature of the film, it was not produced under Disney's name, but rather Disney-owned Touchstone Pictures. Disney wanted the protagonist to have eyes, but the final iteration did not. Over 100 people worked on this motion picture just to create the characters, and it took three years of work to produce the film. Burton collaborated with Selick again for James and the Giant Peach (1996), which Burton produced.

In 1994, Burton and frequent co-producer Denise Di Novi produced the 1994 fantasy-comedy Cabin Boy, starring comedian Chris Elliott and directed/written by Adam Resnick. Burton was originally supposed to direct the film after seeing Elliott perform on Get a Life, but he handed the directing responsibility to Resnick once he was offered Ed Wood. Burton's next film, Ed Wood (1994), was of a much smaller scale, depicting the life of the infamous director Ed Wood. Starring Johnny Depp in the title role, the film is an homage to the low-budget science fiction and horror films of Burton's childhood and handles its comical protagonist and his motley band of collaborators with surprising fondness and sensitivity. Owing to creative squabbles during the making of The Nightmare Before Christmas, Danny Elfman declined to score Ed Wood, and the assignment went to Howard Shore. While a commercial failure at the time of its release, Ed Wood became a cult classic and was well received by critics. Martin Landau received the Academy Award for Best Supporting Actor for his portrayal of Bela Lugosi, and the film received the Academy Award for Best Makeup.

Warner Bros. was not interested in Tim Burton's return as director for a third Batman installment after considering Batman Returns too dark and unsafe for children. Burton noted he was unsure about returning to direct, writing: "I don't think Warner Bros. wanted me to direct a third Batman. I even said that to them." Burton and Warner Bros. mutually agreed to part ways. To attract the young audience, it was decided that Joel Schumacher would direct the third film, whilst Burton would only produce it in conjunction with Peter MacGregor-Scott, in which Burton was given top-billing producer credit, without being able to contribute ideas; only approving director and screenwriters. Following this change and the changes made by the new director, Michael Keaton resigned from the lead role and was replaced by Val Kilmer. Filming for Batman Forever began in late 1994 with new actors: Tommy Lee Jones as Harvey Dent/Two-Face, Nicole Kidman as Dr. Chase Meridian, Chris O'Donnell as Dick Grayson/Robin and Jim Carrey as Edward Nygma/The Riddler; the only two actors who returned after Batman Returns were Pat Hingle as Commissioner Gordon and Michael Gough as Alfred Pennyworth. The film, a combination of the darkness that characterized the saga and colors and neon signs proposed by Schumacher, was a huge box office success, earning $336 million. Warner Bros. demanded that Schumacher delete some scenes so the film did not have the same tone as its predecessor, Batman Returns (later they were added as deleted scenes on the 2005 DVD release).

=== 1995–2010: Established director ===
In 1996, Burton and Selick reunited for the musical fantasy James and the Giant Peach, based on the book by Roald Dahl. Burton, once again, served only as a producer due to his contributions to making Mars Attacks! (1996). The film, a combination of live action and stop motion footage, starred Richard Dreyfuss, Susan Sarandon, David Thewlis, Simon Callow and Jane Leeves among others, with Selick's animation direction. While a box office disappointment for Disney, the film was received well by critics for its story and visual aspects and was nominated for the Academy Award for Best Original Musical or Comedy Score (by Randy Newman).

Elfman and Burton reunited for Mars Attacks!. Based on a popular science-fiction trading card series, the film was a hybrid of 1950s science fiction and 1970s all-star disaster films. The coincidence made it an inadvertent spoof of the blockbuster Independence Day, which had been released five months earlier. The film boasted an all-star cast, including Jack Nicholson, Glenn Close, Annette Bening, Danny DeVito, Pierce Brosnan, Michael J. Fox, Sarah Jessica Parker, Natalie Portman, Lukas Haas, Martin Short, Rod Steiger, Christina Applegate, and Jack Black.

Sleepy Hollow, released in November 1999, had a supernatural setting and starred Johnny Depp as Ichabod Crane, a detective with an interest in forensic science rather than the schoolteacher of Washington Irving's original tale. With Sleepy Hollow, Burton paid homage to the horror films of the English company Hammer Films. Christopher Lee, one of Hammer's stars, was given a cameo role. A host of Burton regulars appeared in supporting roles (Michael Gough, Jeffrey Jones, and Christopher Walken, among others), and Christina Ricci was cast as Katrina van Tassel. A well-regarded supporting cast was headed by Miranda Richardson, Michael Gambon, Richard Griffiths and Ian McDiarmid. Mostly well received by critics, and with a special mention to Elfman's Gothic score, the film grossed $207 million worldwide and won the Academy Award for Best Art Direction, as well as two BAFTAs for Best Costume Design and Best Production Design. A box office success, Sleepy Hollow was also a turning point for Burton. Along with the change in his personal life (separation from actress Lisa Marie), Burton changed radically in style for his next project, leaving the haunted forests and colorful outcasts behind to go on to directing Planet of the Apes which, as Burton had repeatedly noted, was "not a remake" of the earlier film.

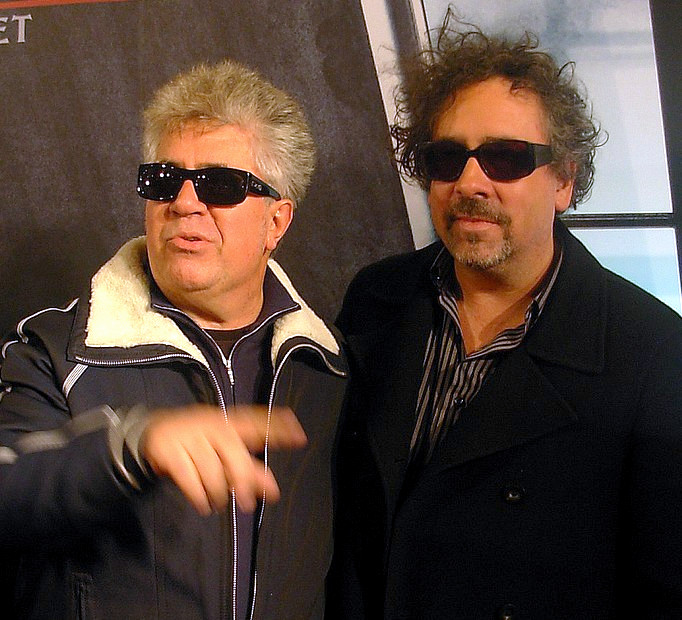
Burton (right) and Pedro Almodóvar at the premiere of Sweeney Todd: The Demon Barber of Fleet Street in Madrid, in 2007

Planet of the Apes was a commercial success, grossing $68 million in its opening weekend and eventually earning $180 million in North America and $362 million total worldwide. The film however, received mixed reviews and is widely considered inferior to the first adaptation of the novel. In 2003, Burton directed Big Fish, based on the novel Big Fish: A Novel of Mythic Proportions by Daniel Wallace. The film is about a father telling the story of his life to his son using exaggeration and color. Starring Ewan McGregor as young Edward Bloom and Albert Finney as an older Edward Bloom, the film also stars Jessica Lange, Billy Crudup, Danny DeVito, Alison Lohman and Marion Cotillard. Big Fish received four Golden Globe nominations as well as an Academy Award nomination for Elfman's score. The film was also the second collaboration between Burton and Helena Bonham Carter, who played the characters of Jenny and the Witch, and Burton and Danny DeVito, who played circus ringleader Amos Calloway.

Charlie and the Chocolate Factory is an adaptation of the book of the same name by Roald Dahl. Starring Johnny Depp as Willy Wonka, Freddie Highmore as Charlie Bucket, and Deep Roy as the Oompa-Loompas, the film generally took a more faithful approach to the source material than the 1971 adaptation, Willy Wonka & the Chocolate Factory, although some liberties were taken, such as adding Wonka's issue with his father (played by Christopher Lee). Charlie and the Chocolate Factory was released in July 2005, grossed $475.8 million worldwide, and was nominated for the Academy Award for Best Costume Design. Filming the project proved difficult as Burton, Depp, and Danny Elfman had to work on this film and Burton's Corpse Bride (2005) at the same time, which was Burton's first full-length stop motion film as a director, featuring the voices of Depp as Victor and Bonham Carter as Emily.

Burton directed his first music video, "Bones", in 2006. "Bones" is the sixth overall single by American indie rock band The Killers and the second released from their second studio album, Sam's Town. Starring in this video were actors Michael Steger and Devon Aoki. Burton went on to direct a second music video for The Killers, "Here with Me", starring Winona Ryder, released in 2012.

The DreamWorks/Warner Bros. project, Sweeney Todd: The Demon Barber of Fleet Street, based on the 1979 Broadway musical, was released on December 21, 2007, to critical acclaim and grossed $153 million worldwide. Burton's work on Sweeney Todd won him the National Board of Review Award for Best Director, received a Golden Globe nomination for Best Director, and won the Academy Award for Best Art Direction. The film blends explicit gore and Broadway tunes and was well received by critics, with Time calling the film "bloody great." Johnny Depp's performance as the murderous barber Sweeney Todd was nominated for the Academy Award for Best Actor.

In 2005, filmmaker Shane Acker released his short film 9, a story about a sentient rag doll living in a post-apocalyptic world who tries to stop machines from destroying the rest of his eight fellow rag dolls. The film won numerous awards and was nominated for an Academy Award for Best Animated Short Film. After seeing the short film, Tim Burton and Timur Bekmambetov, director of Wanted, showed interest in producing a feature-length adaptation of the film. Directed by Acker, the full-length film was produced by Burton, written by Acker (story) and Pamela Pettler (screenplay, co-writer of Corpse Bride), and featured the voice work of Elijah Wood, John C. Reilly, Jennifer Connelly, Christopher Plummer, Martin Landau, and Crispin Glover, among others.

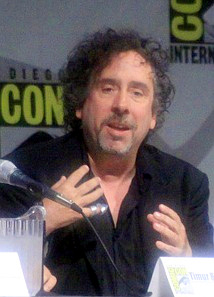
Burton speaking about 9 at Comic-Con, 2009

Burton appeared at the 2009 Comic-Con in San Diego, California, to promote both 9 and Alice in Wonderland; the latter won two Academy Awards, for Best Art Direction and Best Costume Design. In Burton's version of Alice in Wonderland, the story is set 13 years after the original Lewis Carroll tales. Mia Wasikowska was cast as Alice. The original start date for filming was May 2008. Torpoint and Plymouth were the locations used for filming from September 1 to October 14, and the film remains set in the Victorian era. During this time, filming took place in Antony House in Torpoint. 250 local extras were chosen in early August. Other production work took place in London. The film was originally to be released in 2009, but was pushed to March 5, 2010. The film starred Johnny Depp as the Mad Hatter, Matt Lucas as both Tweedledee and Tweedledum, Helena Bonham Carter as the Red Queen, Stephen Fry as the Cheshire Cat, Anne Hathaway as the White Queen, Alan Rickman as Absolem the Caterpillar, Michael Sheen as McTwisp the White Rabbit, and Crispin Glover as the Knave of Hearts, with his face and voice added onto a CGI body. Despite receiving mixed reviews from critics, the film was a commercial success, grossing $1 billion worldwide, making it the highest-grossing film of Burton's career. Burton produced the film's sequel, Alice Through the Looking Glass (2016), which was directed by James Bobin. The film received generally negative reviews from critics and bombed at the box office, losing the studio an estimated $70 million.

=== 2011–2021: Career fluctuations ===
Burton began filming Dark Shadows, a feature film adaptation of the 1960s television series of the same name, in May 2011. In addition to starring Burton regulars Depp and Bonham Carter, the film saw Burton reunite with Batman Returns star Michelle Pfeiffer, while Burton once again collaborated with composer Danny Elfman, production designer Rick Heinrichs, and costume designer Colleen Atwood. The film was released on May 11, 2012, and grossed $245 million worldwide from a $150 million budget. Burton also co-produced Abraham Lincoln: Vampire Hunter with Timur Bekmambetov, who also served as director (they previously worked together in 9). The film, released on June 22, 2012, was based on the novel by screenwriter and novelist Seth Grahame-Smith, who wrote the film's screenplay and also authored Pride and Prejudice and Zombies. The film starred Benjamin Walker as Abraham Lincoln, Anthony Mackie as William H. Johnson, Joseph Mawle as Lincoln's father Thomas, Robin McLeavy as Lincoln's mother, Nancy, and Mary Elizabeth Winstead as Lincoln's love interest (and later wife), Mary Ann Todd. The film received mixed reviews and performed poorly at the box office. He then remade his 1984 short film Frankenweenie as a feature-length stop motion film, distributed by Walt Disney Pictures. Burton has said, "The film is based on a memory that I had when I was growing up and with my relationship with a dog that I had." The film was released on October 5, 2012, and met with positive reviews.

Burton directed the 2014 biographical drama film Big Eyes about American artist Margaret Keane (Amy Adams), whose work was fraudulently claimed in the 1950s and 1960s by her then-husband, Walter Keane (Christoph Waltz), and their heated divorce trial after Margaret accused Walter of stealing credit for her paintings. The script was written by the screenwriters behind Burton's Ed Wood, Scott Alexander and Larry Karaszewski. Filming began in Vancouver, British Columbia, in mid-2013. The film was distributed by The Weinstein Company and released in U.S. theaters on December 25, 2014. It received generally positive reviews from critics.

Burton entered talks to direct a film adaptation of the fantasy novel Miss Peregrine's Home for Peculiar Children, written by Ransom Riggs, in November 2011. The film, starring Asa Butterfield, Eva Green, and Samuel L. Jackson, was released in theatres by 20th Century Fox on September 30, 2016. Burton also directed a live-action adaptation of the Disney animated film Dumbo, released on March 29, 2019, with Colin Farrell, Danny DeVito, Eva Green, and Michael Keaton starring. The film grossed $353 million worldwide against a $170 million budget and combined production and advertising costs of $300 million, ultimately losing money.

=== 2022–present: Wednesday and resurgence ===
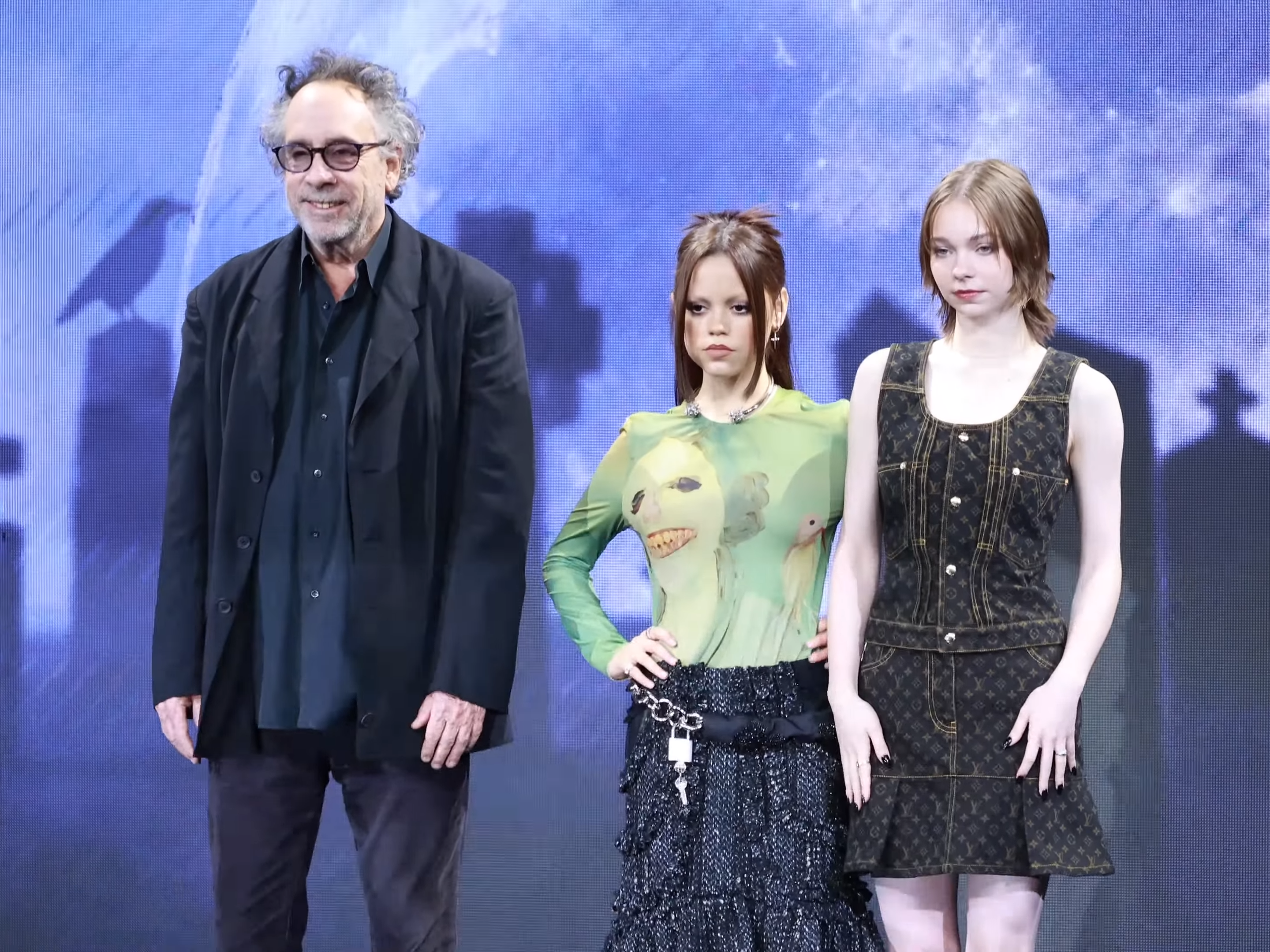
From left to right, director Tim Burton with cast Jenna Ortega and Emma Myers, at a press for Wednesday (season 2) in South Korea, 2025

In February 2021, it was announced that Burton would be directing and producing Wednesday, a series for Netflix based on the titular character from The Addams Family starring Jenna Ortega and Christina Ricci. This marked Burton's first foray into directing television since the 1980s. He helmed four episodes in the first season, which began production in September 2021 for a November 2022 release. The show was released to critical acclaim, and was renewed for a second season in January 2023, which premiered in August 2025.

In October 2022, Burton announced that he would probably never work with The Walt Disney Company again after Dumbo, due to his distinctive style and working approach not matching with what Disney is currently looking for, with its focus on Pixar, Marvel and Lucasfilm. He stated that "It's gotten to be very homogenized, very consolidated. There's less room for different types of things".

In July 2012, It was announced that Burton was working with Seth Grahame-Smith on Beetlejuice Beetlejuice, a project he had been considering making since 1990. Actor Michael Keaton also expressed interest in reprising his role as the title character along with Winona Ryder as Lydia Deetz. In October 2017, Deadline Hollywood reported that Mike Vukadinovich was hired to write a script in time for the film's 30th anniversary. In April 2019, Warner Bros. stated the sequel had been shelved. In February 2022, however, the sequel was announced again, with Brad Pitt's Plan B Entertainment producing alongside Warner Bros. Though Burton initially said that he was not involved, he later backtracked, and the sequel officially started shooting in London on May 10, 2023, with a release date of September 6, 2024, with Burton returning as director, Keaton, Ryder and Catherine O'Hara reprising their roles, and Ortega, Monica Bellucci, and Justin Theroux joining the cast. Beetlejuice Beetlejuice opened the 81st Venice International Film Festival and was theatrically released on September 6, 2024. The film received generally positive reviews from critics and grossed $452 million worldwide.

In 2025, it was announced that Burton would direct a remake of the 1958 science fiction film Attack of the 50 Foot Woman for Warner Bros. Multiple industry reports indicated that Margot Robbie was in early talks to produce and star in the project through her production company LuckyChap Entertainment. Originally, novelist and screenwriter Gillian Flynn was attached to write the first draft of the screenplay, but she exited the project due to other commitments by August 2025. In January 2026, it was announced that Danya Jimenez and Hannah McMehan would now write the screenplay.

On December 18, 2025, rapper and actor A$AP Rocky revealed that he will collaborate on his next film with Burton, who also illustrated the cover art for his fourth studio album Don't Be Dumb (2026). In addition to his work on Wednesday, Burton's later career has included a number of professional activities that reflect his ongoing influence in film and television. In an interview with The Hollywood Reporter, Burton explained that the digital age and streaming platforms allowed him to explore narrative forms not possible in traditional feature films, noting that his visual style adapted well to episodic structures. Industry analysts cited Burton's involvement with Wednesday as a factor in renewed interest from studios and collaborators in adapting other classic intellectual properties. Variety reported that studios viewed his return to serialized television as part of a broader trend of established filmmakers embracing streaming formats to reach global audiences. Beyond television, Burton has continued to be associated with feature film projects and adaptations. In 2024, Burton's feature Beetlejuice Beetlejuice premiered at the 81st Venice International Film Festival to generally positive reviews, with The Guardian noting that the film blended elements of Burton's established visual sensibilities with contemporary narrative rhythms, contributing to its commercial success and grossing over $450 million worldwide.

Commentators have argued that Burton's career in the 2020s reflects a broader shift in Hollywood toward hybrid models of filmmaking that span streaming television and legacy feature films, noting that his sustained relevance demonstrates adaptability and ongoing demand for his distinctive creative voice. A feature in The New York Times described his later work as an example of how mainstream directors can successfully navigate both streaming and theatrical domains, particularly when engaging with franchise intellectual properties adapted for global audiences.

== Unreleased projects ==
After Kevin Smith had been hired to write a new Superman film, he suggested Burton to direct. Burton came on and Warner Bros. set a theatrical release date for the summer of 1998, the 60th anniversary of the character's debut in Action Comics. Nicolas Cage was signed on to play Superman, Burton hired Wesley Strick to rewrite Smith's script, and the film entered pre-production in June 1997. For budgetary reasons, Warner Bros. ordered another rewrite from Dan Gilroy, delayed the film, and ultimately put it on hold in April 1998. Burton then left to direct Sleepy Hollow. Burton has depicted the experience as a difficult one, citing differences with producer Jon Peters and the studio, stating, "I basically wasted a year. A year is a long time to be working with somebody that you don't really want to be working with."

In 2002, The Walt Disney Company began to consider producing a sequel to The Nightmare Before Christmas, but rather than using stop motion, Disney wanted to use computer animation. Burton convinced Disney to drop the idea. "I was always very protective of ['Nightmare'], not to do sequels or things of that kind," Burton explained. "You know, 'Jack visits Thanksgiving world' or other kinds of things, just because I felt the movie had a purity to it and the people that like it... Because it's a mass-market kind of thing, it was important to kind of keep that purity of it." Regardless, in 2009, Henry Selick stated that he could make a sequel to Nightmare if he and Burton could create a good story for it.

In 2012, Shane Acker confirmed that Burton would work with Valve to create his next animated feature film, Deep. Like 9, the film would take place in a post-apocalyptic world (although set in a different universe). Deep would be another darker animated film, as Shane Acker has expressed his interest in creating more PG-13 animated films. Since then, there have been no further mentions of Deep, with Acker focusing on another project announced in 2013 (Beasts of Burden).

Burton was briefly attached to direct Maleficent for Walt Disney Pictures in 2011, but chose to pursue Dark Shadows and Frankenweenie instead.

It was reported that Burton would direct a 3D stop motion animation adaptation of The Addams Family, which was confirmed by Chris Meledandri, but the project was scrapped on July 17, 2013. On July 19, 2010, Burton was announced as the director of the upcoming film adaptation of Monsterpocalypse.

In 2011, it was reported that Burton was working on a live-action adaptation of The Hunchback of Notre-Dame starring Josh Brolin, who would also be co-producing. The project did not move forward.

== Personal life ==
Burton was married to German artist Lena Gieseke from 1987 until their divorce in 1991. From 1992 to 2001, he dated American actress Lisa Marie, who appeared in his films during this time.

Burton began a relationship with English actress Helena Bonham Carter in 2001, having met her while filming Planet of the Apes, to which Marie—much to his dismay—responded in 2005 by holding an auction of personal belongings he had left behind. Together, Burton and Bonham Carter had a son (born 2003) and a daughter (born 2007) before it was revealed in December 2014 that they had amicably separated earlier that year. It was initially unclear whether or not they were married, as Bonham Carter described them as divorced, but other outlets stated that they were never married. In 2023, The Independent reported that they were indeed married for an undisclosed number of years before separating.

On March 15, 2010, Burton received the insignia of Chevalier of Arts and Letters from France's Minister of Culture Frédéric Mitterrand. The same year, he was the president of the jury for the 63rd Cannes Film Festival.

Burton began a relationship with Italian actress Monica Bellucci after they met at the Lumière Film Festival in October 2022, which became known in February 2023. Bellucci first spoke publicly about the relationship in June 2023. They separated in September 2025.

== Exhibitions and books ==
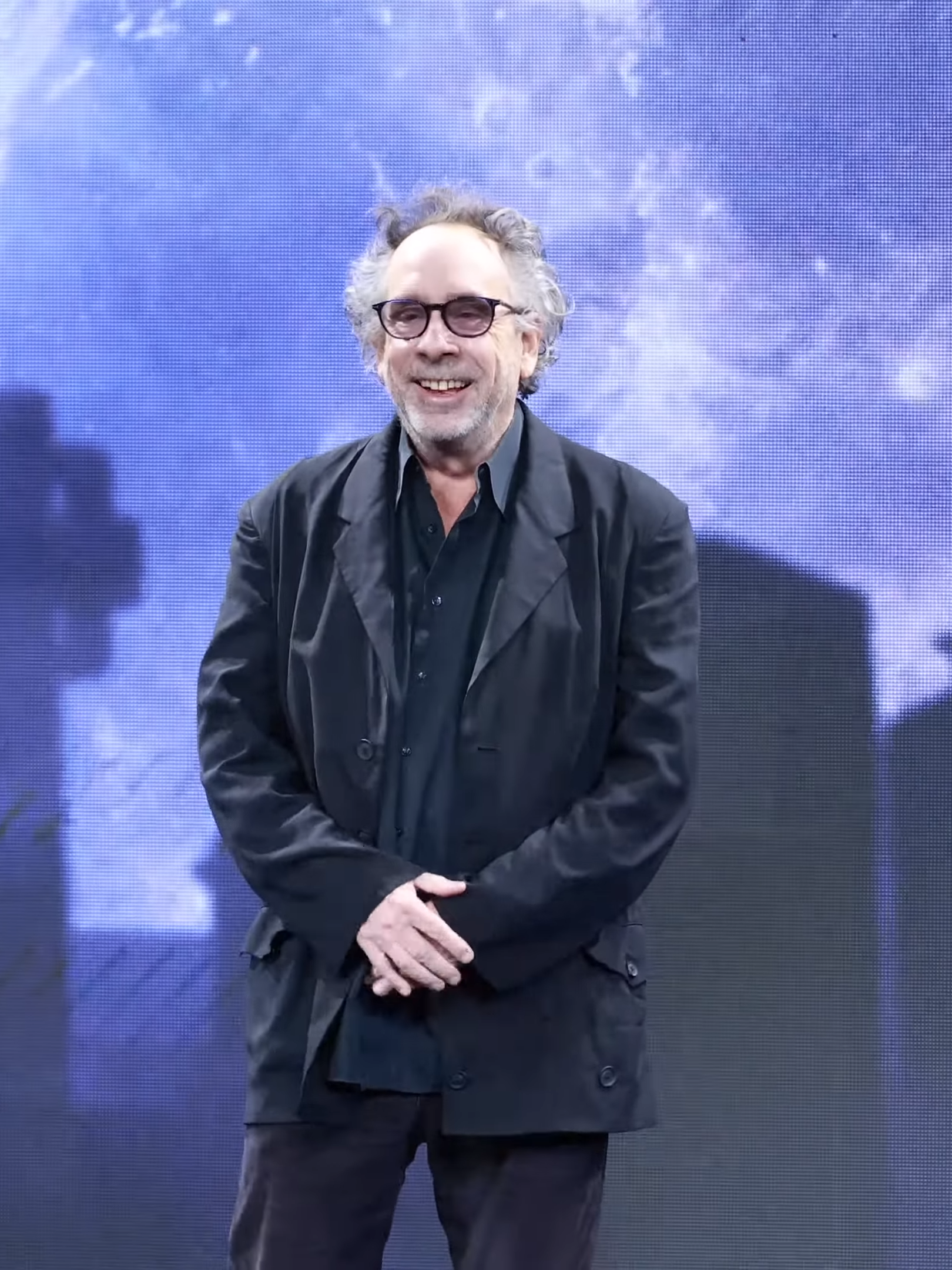
Burton at a press event in South Korea, 2025

From November 22, 2009, to April 26, 2010, Burton had a retrospective at the MoMA in New York with over 700 "drawings, paintings, photographs, storyboards, moving-image works, puppets, maquettes, costumes and cinematic ephemera", including many from the filmmaker's personal collection. From MoMA, the "Tim Burton" exhibition traveled directly to Australian Centre for the Moving Image in Melbourne. Running from June 24 to October 10, 2010, the ACMI exhibition incorporated additional material from Burton's Alice in Wonderland, which was released in March 2010.

"The Art of Tim Burton" was exhibited at the Los Angeles County Museum of Art from May 29 to October 31, 2011, in the Museum's Resnick Pavilion. LACMA also featured six films of Tim Burton's idol, Vincent Price. "Tim Burton, the exhibition/Tim Burton, l'exposition" was exhibited at the Cinémathèque Française from March 7 to August 5, 2012, in Paris, France. All of Tim Burton's movies were shown during the exhibition.

"Tim Burton at Seoul Museum of Art" was exhibited as a promotion of Hyundai Card at Seoul Museum of Art from December 12, 2012, to April 15, 2013, in Seoul, South Korea. This exhibition featured 862 of Burton's works including drawings, paintings, short films, sculptures, music, and costumes that have been used in the making of his feature-length movies. The exhibition was divided into three parts: the first part, "Surviving Burbank", covered his younger years, from 1958 to 1976. The second, "Beautifying Burbank", covers 1977 to 1984, including his time with CalArts and Walt Disney. The last segment, "Beyond Burbank", covers 1985 onward.

"Tim Burton and His World" was exhibited at the Stone Bell House from March 3 to August 8, 2014, in Prague, Czech Republic. The exhibition later premiered at the Museu da Imagem e do Som in São Paulo, Brazil, on February 4, 2016, and lasted until June 5. The exhibition was later held in Artis Tree in Taikoo Place, Hong Kong, from November 5, 2016, to January 23, 2017. The exhibition returned to Brazil from May 28 to August 11, 2019, being held at the Centro Cultural Banco do Brasil in Brasília.

Burton's first exhibition in the United States in nearly a decade, Lost Vegas: Tim Burton, opened in October 2019 at The Neon Museum in Las Vegas.

Burton also wrote and illustrated the poetry book The Melancholy Death of Oyster Boy & Other Stories, published in 1997 by British publishing house Faber and Faber, and a compilation of his drawings, sketches, and other artwork, entitled The Art of Tim Burton, was released in 2009. A follow-up to that book, entitled The Napkin Art of Tim Burton: Things You Think About in a Bar, containing sketches made by Burton on napkins at bars and restaurants he visited, was released in 2015.

== Filmography ==
=== Film ===
Directed features
Year	Title	Distributor
1985	Pee-wee's Big Adventure	Warner Bros.
1988	Beetlejuice	Warner Bros.
1989	Batman	Warner Bros.
1990	Edward Scissorhands	20th Century Fox
1992	Batman Returns	Warner Bros.
1994	Ed Wood	Buena Vista Pictures
1996	Mars Attacks!	Warner Bros.
1999	Sleepy Hollow	Paramount Pictures
2001	Planet of the Apes	20th Century Fox
2003	Big Fish	Sony Pictures Releasing
2005	Charlie and the Chocolate Factory	Warner Bros. Pictures
2005	Corpse Bride	Warner Bros. Pictures
2007	Sweeney Todd: The Demon Barber of Fleet Street	Paramount Pictures / Warner Bros. Pictures
2010	Alice in Wonderland	Walt Disney Studios Motion Pictures
2012	Dark Shadows	Warner Bros. Pictures
2012	Frankenweenie	Walt Disney Studios Motion Pictures
2014	Big Eyes	The Weinstein Company
2016	Miss Peregrine's Home for Peculiar Children	20th Century Fox
2019	Dumbo	Walt Disney Studios Motion Pictures
2024	Beetlejuice Beetlejuice	Warner Bros. Pictures

=== Television ===
Directed television
Year(s)	Title	Distributor
2022–present	Wednesday	Netflix

== Awards and nominations ==
Year	Title	Academy Awards		BAFTA Awards		Golden Globe Awards	
Year	Title	Nominations	Wins	Nominations	Wins	Nominations	Wins
1988	Beetlejuice	1	1	2			
1989	Batman	1	1	6		1	
1990	Edward Scissorhands	1		4	1	1	
1992	Batman Returns	2		2			
1994	Ed Wood	2	2	2		3	1
1999	Sleepy Hollow	3	1	3	2		
2001	Planet of the Apes			2			
2003	Big Fish	1		7		4	
2005	Charlie and the Chocolate Factory	1		4		1	
2005	Corpse Bride	1					
2007	Sweeney Todd: The Demon Barber of Fleet Street	3	1	2		4	2
2010	Alice in Wonderland	3	2	5	2	3	
2012	Frankenweenie	1		1		1	
2014	Big Eyes			2		3	1
2024	Beetlejuice Beetlejuice					1	
Total		20	8	40	5	22	4

== Directed Academy Award performances ==
Under Burton's direction, these actors have received Academy Award nominations (and one win) for their performances in their respective roles.

Year	Performer	Film	Result
Academy Award for Best Actor
2007	Johnny Depp	Sweeney Todd: The Demon Barber of Fleet Street	Nominated
Academy Award for Best Supporting Actor
1994	Martin Landau	Ed Wood	Won

== Bibliography ==
- Salisbury, Mark; Burton, Tim (2000). Burton on Burton. Faber and Faber. ISBN 0-57120-507-0. (original 1995; revised editions 2000, 2006)
- The Melancholy Death of Oyster Boy & Other Stories (1997)
- The Art of Tim Burton, written by Leah Gallo (2009)
- The Napkin Art of Tim Burton: Things You Think About in a Bar, edited by Holly Kempf and Leah Gallo (2015)
