= 1997 in literature =

This article contains information about the literary events and publications of 1997.

== Events ==
- February 20 – Allen Ginsberg makes a final public appearance at the NYU Poetry Slam. He continues to write through his final illness, his last poem being "Things I'll Not Do (Nostalgias)" written on March 30.
- May 27 – Shakespeare's Globe in London, a reconstruction of the Elizabethan Globe Theatre, opens with a production of Shakespeare's Henry V.
- June 3 – The supposed climax of Max Beerbohm's 1916 short story Enoch Soames occurs at the old British Museum Reading Room in London.
- June 26 – J. K. Rowling's first Harry Potter novel, Harry Potter and the Philosopher's Stone, is published in London by Bloomsbury Publishing, in an edition of 500 copies.
- July 13 – The release occurs in Ireland of the film of Patrick McCabe's 1992 novel The Butcher Boy. The author plays Jimmy The Skite, the town drunk.
- September 1 – The Adventures of Captain Underpants, the first in Dav Pilkey's series of children's novels, is published by Scholastic in the United States.
- October – The online literary magazine Jacket is founded.
- November 24 – The new British Library building in London designed by Colin St John Wilson opens to readers.
- December 30 – The memoir I Know Why the Caged Bird Sings by Maya Angelou is removed from the ninth-grade English curriculum in Anne Arundel County, Maryland, for portraying "white people as being horrible, nasty, stupid people".

Uncertain dates

- Tom Clancy signs a deal with Pearson Custom Publishing and Penguin Putnam Inc. giving him US $50 million for the world English rights to two new books. A second agreement pays another $25 million for a four-year book/multimedia deal, and a third, with Berkley Books for 24 paperbacks to tie in with an ABC television miniseries for $22 million.
- Janet Dailey admits to plagiarism of the novels of the fellow American bestselling romance writer Nora Roberts.

== New books ==
=== Fiction ===
- Ben Aaronovitch and Kate Orman – So Vile a Sin
- Mitch Albom – Tuesdays With Morrie
- Martin Amis – Night Train
- Iain Banks – A Song of Stone
- John Banville – The Untouchable
- Hazel Barnes – The Story I Tell Myself
- Marie Bashkirtseff (died 1884) – I Am the Most Interesting Book of All (translation)
- Raymond Benson
  - Tomorrow Never Dies
  - Zero Minus Ten
- Jonathan Blum and Kate Orman – Vampire Science
- Roberto Bolaño – Last Evenings on Earth (Llamadas Telefonicas)
- Pascal Bruckner – Les Voleurs de beauté
- Simon Bucher-Jones – Ghost Devices
- Christopher Bulis – A Device of Death
- Tim Burton – The Melancholy Death of Oyster Boy & Other Stories
- Candace Bushnell – Sex and the City
- Peter Carey – Jack Maggs
- Caleb Carr – The Angel of Darkness
- Agatha Christie (died 1976) – collected short stories
  - The Harlequin Tea Set
  - While the Light Lasts and Other Stories
- Daniel Clowes – Ghost World (graphic novel)
- Warwick Collins – Gents
- Bernard Cornwell
  - Sharpe's Tiger
  - Excalibur: A Novel of Arthur
- Patricia Cornwell
  - Hornet's Nest
  - Unnatural Exposure
- Paul Cornell – Oh No It Isn't!
- Jim Crace – Quarantine
- Robert Crais – Indigo Slam
- Ann C. Crispin
  - The Hutt Gambit
  - The Paradise Snare
- 'Misha Defonseca' – Misha: A Mémoire of the Holocaust Years (published as non-fiction)
- Don DeLillo – Underworld
- Anita Diamant – The Red Tent
- Terrance Dicks
  - The Eight Doctors
  - Mean Streets
- Fernanda Eberstadt – When the Sons of Heaven Meet the Daughters of the Earth
- Bernardine Evaristo – Lara
- Charles Frazier – Cold Mountain
- Anthony Frewin – London Blues
- Anastasia Gosteva – Дочь самурая (The Samurai's Daughter)
- John Grisham – The Partner
- Barbara Hambly – Planet of Twilight
- Allison Hedge Coke – Dog Road Woman
- Matt Jones – Beyond the Sun
- Sebastian Junger – The Perfect Storm
- Winona LaDuke – Last Standing Woman
- Joe R. Lansdale – Bad Chili
- Paul Leonard – Genocide
- Melissa Lucashenko – Steam Pigs
- Ann-Marie MacDonald – Fall on Your Knees
- Bernard MacLaverty – Grace Notes
- Ian R. MacLeod – Voyages by Starlight
- Norman Mailer – The Gospel According to the Son
- Ian McEwan – Enduring Love
- David A. McIntee – The Dark Path
- Lawrence Miles
  - Down
- Mark Morris – The Bodysnatchers
- Toni Morrison – Paradise
- Jim Mortimore – Eternity Weeps
- Herta Müller – The Appointment
- Ryū Murakami (村上 龍) – In the Miso Soup (イン ザ・ミソスープ, English translation 2005)
- Courttia Newland – The Scholar
- Kate Orman – The Room with No Doors
- Hanne Ørstavik – Kjærlighet (Love)
- Lance Parkin – The Dying Days
- James Patterson – Cat and Mouse
- Cyril Pearl – Morisson of Peking
- John Peel – War of the Daleks
- Pepetela – A Gloriosa Família
- Marc Platt – Lungbarrow
- Terry Pratchett – Jingo
- Annie Proulx – "Brokeback Mountain" (short story)
- Thomas Pynchon – Mason & Dixon
- Kathy Reichs – Déjà Dead
- Nina Revoyr – The Necessary Hunger
- Justin Richards – Dragons' Wrath
- Mordecai Richler – Barney's Version
- Gareth Roberts – The Well-Mannered War
- Philip Roth – American Pastoral
- Arundhati Roy – The God of Small Things
- Don Miguel Ruiz – The Four Agreements
- Gary Russell
  - Deadfall
  - Instruments of Darkness
- Will Self – Great Apes
- Carol Shields – Larry's Party
- Sidney Sheldon – The Best Laid Plans
- Michael Stackpole – The Bacta War
- Danielle Steel
  - The Ghost
  - The Ranch
  - Special Delivery
- Dave Stone
  - Burning Heart
  - Ship of Fools
- William Sutcliffe – Are You Experienced?
- Antonio Tabucchi – The Missing Head of Damasceno Monteiro (La testa perduta di Damasceno Monteiro)
- Kaoru Takamura – Redi joka (レディ・ジョーカー, Lady Joker) (book publication completed)
- Eckhart Tolle – The Power of Now
- Zlatko Topčić – Nightmare
- Kurt Vonnegut – Timequake
- Lulu Wang – Het Lelietheater (The Lily Theatre)
- Niall Williams – Four Letters of Love
- Connie Willis – To Say Nothing of the Dog
- Timothy Zahn – Specter of the Past
- Roger Zelazny and Jane Lindskold – Donnerjack

=== Children and young people ===
- Lloyd Alexander – The Iron Ring
- Lynne Reid Banks – Harry the Poisonous Centipede: A Story to Make You Squirm (first in the Harry the Poisonous Centipede trilogy)
- 'Asta Bowen – Wolf: A Journey Home
- Nancy Butts - The Door in the Lake
- Cao Wenxuan (曹文軒) – The Grass House (草房子)
- Sarah Ferguson – Budgie the Little Helicopter (first in an eponymous series of 5 books)
- Mem Fox – Whoever You Are
- Cornelia Funke – Dragon Rider
- Virginia Hamilton (with Barry Moser) – A Ring of Tricksters: Animal Tales from America, the West Indies, and Africa
- Mark Helprin (with Chris Van Allsburg) – The Veil of Snows
- William Mayne – Lady Muck (illustrated by Jonathan Heale)
- Eloise Jarvis McGraw – The Moorchild
- Junko Morimoto – The Two Bullies
- Barbara Nichol (with Barry Moser) – Dippers
- Mary Pope Osborne (with Ned Bittinger) – Rocking Horse Christmas
- Dav Pilkey – The Adventures of Captain Underpants (first in the Captain Underpants series of 12 books)
- Philip Pullman – The Subtle Knife
- Rick Riordan – Big Red Tequila
- J. K. Rowling – Harry Potter and the Philosopher's Stone (first book in the Harry Potter series)
- Ron Roy – The Absent Author (first in the A to Z Mysteries series of 26 books)
- Simms Taback – There was an Old Lady who Swallowed a Fly
- Vivian Walsh – Olive, the Other Reindeer
- Jacqueline Wilson – Girls in Love

=== Drama ===
- Jon Fosse – Nightsongs
- Lee Hall – Spoonface Steinberg (radio monologue)
- Moisés Kaufman – Gross Indecency: The Three Trials of Oscar Wilde
- Thomas Kilroy – The Secret Fall of Constance Wilde
- Conor McPherson – The Weir
- Patrick Marber – Closer
- Richard Nelson – Goodnight Children Everywhere
- Peter Whelan – The Herbal Bed

=== Poetry ===
- Ted Hughes – Tales from Ovid

=== Non-fiction ===
- Dave Barry – Dave Barry's Book of Bad Songs
- Jean-Dominique Bauby – The Diving Bell and the Butterfly (Le Scaphandre et le papillon)
- Cari Beauchamp – Without Lying Down: Frances Marion and the Powerful Women of Early Hollywood
- Jan Bondeson – A Cabinet of Medical Curiosities
- Bill Bryson – A Walk in the Woods
- D. K. Chakrabarti – Colonial Indology : sociopolitics of the ancient Indian past
- Iris Chang – The Rape of Nanking
- Jared Diamond – Guns, Germs and Steel
- Jenny Diski – Skating to Antarctica
- Michael Drosnin – The Bible Code
- Gerina Dunwich – A Wiccan's Guide to Prophecy and Divination
- Geoff Dyer – Out of Sheer Rage: In the Shadow of D. H. Lawrence
- Timothy Ferris – The Whole Shebang: A State-of-the-Universe(s) Report
- Benjamin Fondane (died 1944) – Le Voyageur n'a pas fini de voyager
- Stephen Fry – Moab Is My Washpot (autobiography)
- Charlotte Gray – Mrs. King
- Alan Guth – The Inflationary Universe
- Robert Hughes – American Visions: The Epic History of Art in America
- Jesse Lee Kercheval – Building Fiction
- Betty Kobayashi Issenman – Sinews of Survival
- Geneviève Lacambre – Gustave Moreau : Maître sorcier
- B. B. Lal – The Earliest civilization of South Asia: rise, maturity, and decline
- Peter Maas – Underboss
- Deborah Madison – Vegetarian Cooking for Everyone
- James McBride – The Color of Water
- Adele Morales – The Last Party: Scenes From My Life with Norman Mailer
- Penguin Random House – Random House Webster's Unabridged Dictionary
- E. Wayne Ross – The Social Studies Curriculum
- Ian Smith – The Great Betrayal
- Alan Sokal and Jean Bricmont – Fashionable Nonsense
- Maria Todorova – Imagining the Balkans
- Larry Trask – The Penguin Guide to Punctuation
- Kevin Warwick – March of the Machines
- Thierry Zéphir – Khmer: The Lost Empire of Cambodia

== Births ==
- February 12 – Alexander Nikolov, Bulgarian poet
- June 22 – Aqiil Gopee, Mauritian writer and poet
- November 28 – Franz Mherryon Robles, Filipino novelist and aphorist

== Deaths ==
- January 19 – James Dickey, American poet and novelist (born 1923)
- February 3 – Bohumil Hrabal, Czech novelist (born 1914)
- February 18 – Emily Hahn, American journalist and author (born 1905)
- March 21 - Wilbert Awdry, British Anglican reverend and author (born 1911)
- April 5 – Allen Ginsberg, American poet (liver cancer, born 1926)
- May 9 – Rina Lasnier, Canadian poet (born 1915)
- May 23 – Alison Adburgham, English social historian and journalist (born 1912)
- June 8 – George Turner, Australian novelist and critic (born 1916)
- June 11 – Susanna Roth, Swiss bohemist and literary translator (born 1950)
- July 26 – Joseph Henry Reason, American librarian (born 1905)
- August 2 – William S. Burroughs, American novelist (born 1914
- August 16 – Gerard McLarnon, Irish actor and playwright (born 1915)
- August 27 – Johannes Edfelt, Swedish poet, translator and critic (born 1904)
- October 14 – Harold Robbins, American novelist (born 1916)
- October 16 – James A. Michener, American novelist and historian (born 1907)
- November 6 – Leon Forrest, African American novelist and essayist (cancer, born 1937)
- November 30 – Kathy Acker, American novelist and poet (breast cancer, born 1947)
- December 14 – Owen Barfield, British philosopher, author and poet (born 1898)

== Awards ==
- Nobel Prize for Literature: Dario Fo
- Europe Theatre Prize: Robert Wilson
- Camões Prize: Pepetela

=== Australia ===
- The Australian/Vogel Literary Award: Eva Sallis, Hiam
- C. J. Dennis Prize for Poetry: Les Murray, Subhuman Redneck Poems
- Kenneth Slessor Prize for Poetry: Anthony Lawrence, The Viewfinder
- Mary Gilmore Prize: Morgan Yasbincek, Night Reversing
- Miles Franklin Award: David Foster, The Glade Within the Grove

=== Canada ===
- Bronwen Wallace Memorial Award: Rachel Rose
- Giller Prize for Canadian Fiction: Mordecai Richler, Barney's Version
- See 1997 Governor General's Awards for a complete list of winners and finalists for those awards.
- Edna Staebler Award for Creative Non-Fiction: Anne Mullens, Timely Death

=== France ===
- Prix Goncourt: Patrick Rambaud, La Bataille
- Prix Décembre: Lydie Salvayre, La Compagnie des spectres
- Prix Médicis International: T. Coraghessan Boyle, America
- Prix Médicis French: Les Sept Noms du peintre – Philippe Le Guillou

=== Spain ===
- Premio Miguel de Cervantes: Guillermo Cabrera Infante

=== United Kingdom ===
- Booker Prize: Arundhati Roy, The God of Small Things
- Carnegie Medal for children's literature: Tim Bowler, River Boy
- James Tait Black Memorial Prize for fiction: Andrew Miller, Ingenious Pain
- James Tait Black Memorial Prize for biography: R. F. Foster, William Butler Yeats: A Life, Volume 1 – The Apprentice Mage 1965-1914
- Cholmondeley Award: Alison Brackenbury, Gillian Clarke, Tony Curtis, Anne Stevenson
- Eric Gregory Award: Matthew Clegg, Sarah Corbett, Polly Clark, Tim Kendall, Graham Nelson, Matthew Welton
- Orange Prize for Fiction: Anne Michaels, Fugitive Pieces
- Whitbread Best Book Award: Ted Hughes, Tales from Ovid

=== United States ===
- Agnes Lynch Starrett Poetry Prize: Richard Blanco, City of a Hundred Fires
- Aiken Taylor Award for Modern American Poetry: Fred Chappell
- American Academy of Arts and Letters Gold Medal in Poetry, John Ashbery
- Compton Crook Award: Richard Garfinkle, Celestial Matters
- Hugo Award: Kim Stanley Robinson, Blue Mars
- Nebula Award: Vonda McIntyre, The Moon and the Sun
- Newbery Medal for children's literature: E. L. Konigsburg, The View from Saturday
- Pulitzer Prize for Drama: no award given
- Pulitzer Prize for Fiction: Steven Millhauser – Martin Dressler: The Tale of an American Dreamer
- Pulitzer Prize for Poetry: Lisel Mueller: Alive Together: New and Selected Poems
- Wallace Stevens Award: Anthony Hecht
- Whiting Awards:

Fiction: Josip Novakovich (fiction/nonfiction), Melanie Rae Thon
Nonfiction: Jo Ann Beard, Suketu Mehta (fiction/nonfiction), Ellen Meloy
Plays: Erik Ehn
Poetry: Connie Deanovich, Forrest Gander, Jody Gladding, Mark Turpin

=== Elsewhere ===
- Friedenspreis des Deutschen Buchhandels: Yaşar Kemal
- International Dublin Literary Award: Javier Marías, A Heart So White
- Premio Nadal: Carlos Cañeque, Quién

== Notes ==
- Hahn, Daniel (2015). The Oxford Companion to Children's Literature (2nd ed.). Oxford. University Press. ISBN 9780198715542.
