= Aleksandar Nikolov =

Aleksandar Nikolov may refer to:

- Alexander Nikolov (boxer) (born 1940), Bulgarian boxer
- Alexander Nikolov (poet) (born 1997), Bulgarian poet
- Aleksandar Nikolov (cyclist) (1912–?), Bulgarian cyclist
- Aleksandar Nikolov (swimmer) (born 1992), Bulgarian swimmer
- Aleksandar Nikolov (computer scientist), Canadian theoretical computer scientist
- Aleksandar Nikolov (volleyball) (born 2003), Bulgarian volleyball player
