= Mark Turpin =

Mark Turpin may refer to:

- Mark Turpin (poet), American poet
- Mark Turpin (tennis), American tennis player
