= Stabbing of Adele Morales =

1960 event

On November 20, 1960, artist and actress Adele Morales was stabbed twice by her then-husband, American writer Norman Mailer, at their New York apartment following a party. Mailer had intended to use the party to informally announce his candidacy for mayor. Though severely injured, Morales survived the attack. Due to Morales's decision not to take legal action, the prosecution was unable to press the felony assault charge initially filed against him. Mailer pleaded guilty to the lesser charge of third-degree assault.

== Background ==
Adele Morales moved to Greenwich Village in Manhattan, New York, in 1940. A single woman active in the local art and literary scene, she worked as a painter, studied under Hans Hofmann, and performed at the Actors Studio.

Morales met Norman Mailer in 1951. She began an affair with the married Mailer, and he moved into her apartment. As a couple, Morales and Mailer were known for their frequent public disputes, presence at social gatherings, and involvement in countercultural activities, such as drug use and nontraditional relationships.

Frank Corsaro, a director at the Actors Studio who worked with both individuals, recalled that "between the two of them they used to abuse each other endlessly." In Mailer: His Life and Time, Peter Manso's biography of Norman Mailer, Mailer's sister Barbara explained the Village culture during the 1960s:

It was the fashion to push things to their ultimate extreme--all kinds of sexual and drug experimentation ... It was the beginning of the Sixties, really ... it was all very violent ... I did not like being part of it ... but one sensed that it was all getting out of hand.

Morales and Mailer married in 1954 and had two children, Danielle "Dandy" Mailer (born 1957) and Elizabeth Anne "Betsy" Mailer (born 1959). Mailer and Morales were prominent figures in the art and literary scene, specifically within Greenwich Village in 1960.

== Stabbing ==
Mailer and Morales hosted a large party the evening of November 19, 1960, at their 250 West 94th Street apartment on the Upper West Side to celebrate Roger Donoghue's 30th birthday. According to Mailer: A Biography, Mailer wanted to run for mayor of New York City and informally announce his candidacy at the party, using it as a venue to showcase his political strategy to "meld the dispossessed" with "social, political, and artistic elite[s]." He asked his friend George Plimpton to invite some prominent city officials to mix with a large group of disadvantaged persons from the city.

Rather than facilitating connections between the groups, the gathering became volatile, dominated by intoxicated and disruptive guests. As the night went on, Mailer became physically confrontational and challenged multiple individuals to fight. The situation deteriorated to the point that guests began leaving, reportedly fearing both general violence and Mailer's behavior.

By around 3:00 a.m., about twenty people remained. Mailer, reportedly intoxicated, was described as dividing guests "on opposite sides of the room based on whether he considered them 'for' or 'against' him," placing Morales among those he viewed as opposed to him. Mailer left the apartment and began fighting people in the street. According to Morales, "He didn't know who he was, he didn't know what his name was. He was so out of it."

At approximately 4:30 a.m., Mailer returned with a black eye and a torn shirt. Only five or six guests remained. According to reports, an argument ensued before the stabbing.

Around 5:00 a.m. on November 20, 1960, Mailer stabbed Morales. As Mailer biographer Hilary Mills wrote:

He took out a two-and-a-half-inch-long penknife and went at his wife, stabbing her in the upper abdomen and back. One stab wound was later described as three inches deep and three quarters of an inch wide, a 'thrust near the heart.'

Mailer reportedly said to the guests, "Don't touch her. Let the bitch die." The guests sought assistance from novelist Doc Humes, who lived in the apartment downstairs. Humes then contacted Morales's mother and Mailer's sister, Barbara. Once they arrived, an ambulance transported Morales to University Hospital, where she was admitted around 8:00 a.m.

Mailer remained in the couple's apartment with their then-fourteen-month-old daughter Elizabeth and refused to let anyone enter, including relatives and private psychiatric help, until Barbara explained the severity of the situation via telephone. By the time Morales's mother arrived to collect the child, Mailer had vacated the premises.

== Aftermath ==
Morales was in critical condition while at University Hospital. Convinced by Doc Humes, Morales initially told doctors at the hospital that she had fallen on glass and denied Mailer's involvement. Mailer came to the hospital later that night and reportedly spoke with Morales's surgeon about her wounds. The following day, he appeared for an interview with Mike Wallace for WNTA-TV. During this interview, he described the knife as a symbol of manhood and continued to campaign for mayor, stating that the incident did not disqualify him from candidacy.

On November 21, 1960, while still at the hospital, Morales revealed to police that Mailer stabbed her. He was arrested later that night when he arrived at the hospital to visit her. The following day, on November 22, 1960, Mailer appeared in court to face a felonious assault charge for the stabbing. Mailer told the gathered reporters that he loved Morales. During the hearing, a medical report from Dr. Conrad Rosenberg pronounced Mailer "both homicidal and suicidal." Magistrate Reuben Levy stated that Mailer could not "distinguish fiction from reality" and committed him to Bellevue Hospital for observation, where he remained for 17 days. Mailer maintained his sanity, insisting, "I have never been out of my mental faculties," and expressed concern that his work would be perceived differently if he were considered to have a disordered mind.

Morales accompanied Mailer to a later court appearance on January 12, 1961, during which she testified that "my husband and I are perfectly happy together," and that she was too drunk to have seen the penknife. She also declined to sign a complaint against Mailer. Despite this, a reporter later told Mailer that a grand jury had indicted him on charges of felony assault. Morales's refusal to press charges allowed Mailer to plead guilty to third-degree assault and receive a suspended sentence. At the sentencing, Mailer said, "I feel I did a lousy, dirty, cowardly thing."

Morales and Mailer divorced in 1962. According to Morales, Mailer resumed his prior pattern of unpredicted actions shortly after being released from Bellevue Hospital, including heavy drinking, partying, and displaying what she perceived as a limited public expression of remorse or recognition of the gravity of the assault. In a 1979 interview published in High Times, Mailer explained that his commitment to Bellevue Hospital had been a strategic decision made by his attorney to avoid incarceration, particularly in the event that his wife did not survive her injuries. Many years later, in an interview with Lawrence Grobel published in 2008, Mailer was questioned about the medical assessment conducted at the time of the incident, in which a doctor declared he was a danger to himself and others. He responded, "Well, since I didn't kill anybody after that and I didn't commit suicide nor have a mental breakdown, my guess is that he wasn't too accurate."

Morales stated that the only instance resembling a personal apology occurred in 1988, more than two decades after the incident, when Mailer made a brief, offhand remark about the incident during a conversation at their daughter Elizabeth's wedding reception.

The stabbing had a lasting impact on Morales. While she did not press charges, citing a desire to protect their children, her daughter stated that Morales "remained scarred and angry for decades." Morales also wrote about the isolation during her recovery, contrasting it with the public attention Mailer received in the aftermath. Mailer continued to enjoy critical acclaim after the incident, including winning two Pulitzer Prizes. Following Morales's passing, her daughter Elizabeth stated in a telephone interview, “After he died, all she could say was, ‘He was a monster.’”

In her memoir, Morales provides a detailed account of the deterioration of her relationship with Norman Mailer and the moment leading up to the stabbing: frequent escalated conflict, infidelity, excessive drinking, late-night partying, and volatile behavior. She describes these actions as part of a broader pattern of disregard and emotional instability that strained their marriage, including instances of physical and emotional abuse. She also felt she enabled Mailer's behavior due to her own struggles with alcoholism and anger issues, writing, "I was not helping him or myself by accepting his behavior and that, too, was part of my alcoholic sickness."

== Public and critical reaction ==
Many in Mailer's social circle believed the incident would end his career, but it ultimately increased his notoriety. Two years following the incident, Mailer published a book of poems called Deaths for the Ladies (and Other Disasters), which included passages that seemed to reference the stabbing and Morales. The work was received with some acclaim. Writer Paul B. Newman points out that Mailer "cries out" that sex seems to harm men, and one of Mailer's "most moving cries" is a passage Newman felt was directed at Morales, where Mailer called her a "greedy bitch." Five years after the stabbing, Norman Mailer published An American Dream, in which the protagonist strangles his wife, throws her body out the window of an East Side apartment building, and feels satisfaction in the aftermath.

Among Mailer and Morales's friends and literary peers, the response to the stabbing was, according to some critics, notably restrained. In a 1983 interview with New York Magazine, Mailer reflected that his friends "closed ranks" behind him and described their response as "five degrees less warmth than I was accustomed to. Not fifteen degrees less—five." Lennon writes that Mailer's friends believed that Morales contributed to the stabbing by "goading him into" it and by being "a lousy wife," and thought that Mailer "finally did to Morales what should've been done years earlier."

Some literary critics and contemporaries interpreted the assault as an artistic or literary act. Others argued that the attack was consistent with Mailer's cultivated public persona, which often emphasized hypermasculinity and defiance of social norms. James Baldwin, a writer and friend of Mailer, described it as an attempt to escape from "the spiritual prison he had created with his fantasies of becoming a politician," comparing it to "burning down the house in order to, at last, be free of it." Diana Trilling, a literary critic and member of the New York intellectual circle, later recalled her husband, Lionel Trilling, describing the stabbing as a "Dostoyevskian ploy," a means for Mailer to "test the limits of evil in himself." At the time, some of Mailer's friends considered him to be on the verge of dementia. Mailer later claimed that he had stabbed Morales "to relieve her of cancer," a statement critics cited as further evidence of his unstable state.

The incident also drew criticism from feminist writers, particularly Kate Millett in her 1970 work Sexual Politics, who connected the attack with recurring themes of sexual violence found throughout Mailer's work. Despite the controversy, Mailer remained a public figure and launched a second mayoral campaign in 1969. He received 5% of the vote and, despite earlier feminist criticism, gained support from some prominent feminists, including Bella Abzug and Gloria Steinem.

In a 1971 appearance on The Dick Cavett Show, Mailer stated, "We all know that I stabbed my wife many years ago. We all know that." In The Time of Our Time (1998), Mailer writes about the stabbing, saying that he is "irredeemably guilty." In a 2000 interview, Mailer described the stabbing as "the one act I can look back on and regret for the rest of my life."

== See also ==
- Adele Morales
- The Last Party
- Norman Mailer
