= Jonathan Blum (writer, born 1972) =

American writer

- Born: May 1972 (age 54)
- Education: University of Maryland, College Park
- Occupation: Writer
- Spouse: Kate Orman

Jonathan Blum (born May 1972) is an American writer most known for his work for various Doctor Who spin-offs, usually with his wife Kate Orman although he has also been published on his own.

== Personal life ==
Blum grew up in Maryland and attended the University of Maryland, College Park. He is a member of Alpha Phi Omega co-ed service fraternity.

== Work ==
Blum started out as a fan of the BBC Television series Doctor Who, and in particular the spin-off range of novels the New Adventures, and was mostly known for his discussions of the program and its spin-offs on RADW, and also for writing and starring in several fan films such as Time Rift, in which he impersonated Sylvester McCoy as the Seventh Doctor.

Blum has joked that he slept his way into the Doctor Who range—his first credited professional work was the BBC Books' Eighth Doctor Adventure Vampire Science (BBC Books, 1997) written with his soon-to-be wife Kate Orman, who had already made her name with several popular New Adventures. (He had contributed scenes to a couple of those books, Return of the Living Dad and The Room with No Doors, and been credited internally but not on the cover.) He has since written two further Eighth Doctor Adventures with Orman, Seeing I (BBC Books, 1998) and Unnatural History (BBC Books, 1999). Orman's 2001 solo novel The Year of Intelligent Tigers was credited on the spine to Orman, but internally as "story by Jonathan Blum and Kate Orman"; Blum provided the full outline and several interlude segments, as well as scenes for Orman's Blue Box (BBC Books, 2003).

Blum's work as a solo writer began with the short story Model Train Set from the first BBC Short Trips collect in 1998. He has also written the novella Fallen Gods, published by Telos Publishing Ltd. in 2003, which was highly popular and won the Aurealis Award for Best Australian Science Fiction Novel in 2003: the novella is credited to both Blum and Orman, but both authors have acknowledged that Blum did the majority of the writing and Orman's input was limited.

Blum has also written for Big Finish's range of audio adventures, with The Fearmonger being released in 2000. Blum has also written several short stories for Big Finish's short story collections, Short Trips, and stories and novellas for their Bernice Summerfield and Iris Wildthyme series.

He has been nominated twice for the Aurealis Award (winning once) and once for the Ditmar Award.

His other novel work includes Mediasphere (2015), a Blake's 7 novel co-written with Orman, and The Prisoners Dilemma (2005), a novel based on Patrick McGoohan's series The Prisoner, co-written with his friend Rupert Booth and featuring an introduction by J. Michael Straczynski.

Blum has also written and directed a number of short films, including Audition For Murder, a tribute to the Australian adventure-spoof series Danger 5 which was approved by the show's producers. In 2003 and 2005, he edited two no-budget, Doctor Who "inspired" indie shorts for Australian fan Andrew Merkelbach, The Curse of the Del Garria and Red. The films each received a single (separate) cinema screening at the same multiplex cinema local to their director, but neither is available to purchase or view. Blum also wrote several drafts of the Doctor Who spinoff BBV production Zygon (2007) but asked for his name to be removed from the credits. He also assistant-directed and edited Kyla Ward's short horror-comedy Bad Reception, as shown at the A Night of Horror International Film Festival, and directed various other video clips constructed around Ward's poetry.
