= The Melancholy Death of Oyster Boy & Other Stories =

1997 poetry book by Tim Burton

- First edition US cover
- Author: Tim Burton
- Illustrator: Tim Burton
- Cover artist: Tim Burton
- Language: English
- Genre: Poetry; Black humor
- Publisher: William Morrow and Company
- Publication date: 1997
- Publication place: United States
- Media type: Hardcover
- Pages: 115
- ISBN: 0-688-15681-9

The Melancholy Death of Oyster Boy & Other Stories is a 1997 poetry book written and illustrated by film director Tim Burton. The poems, which are full of black humor, tell stories of hybrid kids, spontaneous transformers, and women who have babies to win over men.

Some characters of the book would later appear in the Flash animation series Stainboy, which was created, directed, and written by Burton.

The characters

- Stick Boy and Match Girl in Love
- Voodoo Girl
- Robot Boy
- Staring Girl
- The Boy with Nails in His Eyes
- The Girl with Many Eyes
- Stain Boy
- The Melancholy Death of Oyster Boy
- Stain Boy's Special Christmas
- The Girl Who Turned into a Bed
- Roy, the Toxic Boy
- James
- Stick Boy's Festive Season
- Brie Boy
- Mummy Boy
- Junk Girl
- The Pin Cushion Queen
- Melonhead
- Sue
- Jimmy, the Hideous Penguin Boy
- Char Boy
- Anchor Baby
- Oyster Boy Steps Out

== Origin of title poem ==
According to American comics artist and publisher Stephen R. Bissette, the title poem "The Melancholy Death of Oyster Boy" was originally conceived as a project for Bissette's comics anthology Taboo and was actually written by horror novelist Michael McDowell, who had previously worked with Burton on the screenplays for Beetlejuice and The Nightmare Before Christmas. McDowell is thanked in the acknowledgements at the end of the book, but is not credited for writing the poem.

== Reception ==
The Melancholy Death of Oyster Boy & Other Stories received a B+ from Entertainment Weekly.

== See also ==
- Junk Girl, 2014 Iranian animated film adaptation
