= Aleksandar Nikolov (computer scientist) =

Bulgarian-Canadian computer scientist

- Born: Varna, Bulgaria
- Education: St. Peter's University
- Alma mater: Rutgers University
- Scientific career
- Fields: Differential privacy, discrepancy theory
- Workplaces: University of Toronto
- Thesis: New computational aspects of discrepancy theory (2014)
- Doctoral advisor: S. Muthukrishnan
- Website: www.cs.toronto.edu/~anikolov/

Aleksandar Nikolov is a Bulgarian and Canadian theoretical computer scientist working on differential privacy, discrepancy theory, and high-dimensional geometry. He is a professor at the University of Toronto.

Nikolov obtained his Ph.D. from Rutgers University in 2014 under the supervision of S. Muthukrishnan (Thesis: New computational aspects of discrepancy theory).

Nikolov is the Canada Research Chair in Algorithms and Private Data Analysis.
