= Junk Girl =

2014 Iranian animated film

- Directed by: Mohammad Zare; Shalale Kheiri
- Screenplay by: Shalale Kheiri
- Based on: "Junk Girl" by Tim Burton
- Release date: 2014
- Running time: 15 minutes
- Country: Iran
- Language: Persian

Junk Girl is a 2014 Iranian stop motion animated short film created in Tabriz by Shalale Kheiri and Mohammad Zare. The film is an adaptation of the namesake poem from Tim Burton's The Melancholy Death of Oyster Boy & Other Stories. To date, the film has been nominated for awards in several different film festivals around the world. Junk Girl was also screened at the Tehran International Short Film Festival.

== Synopsis ==
There was once a girl who was made up of junk. She looked dirty, and smelled like a skunk. She was unhappy and down in the dumps. There was a light in her life, and that was a man who liked her a lot. But she made a decision that was a bit too harsh.
