= Thierry Zéphir =

French research engineer

- Education: École du Louvre
- Occupations: Specialist in Indian and Khmer art
- Employer(s): École du Louvre; Guimet Museum
- Notable work: Khmer: The Lost Empire of Cambodia; L'Âge d'or de l'Inde classique

Thierry Zéphir (born 19--) is a French research engineer (ingénieur d'études) at the Guimet Museum, and a specialist in Khmer art and the Indianised world.

== Career ==
Thierry Zéphir is a former student of Albert Le Bonheur (1938–1996), and a graduate of the École du Louvre where he now teaches the arts of India and the Indianized world. Since 1991, he has regularly participated in the training of students at the Faculty of Archaeology of the Royal University of Fine Arts in Phnom Penh. He is also the author of numerous books and scholarly articles.

He curated several exhibitions including "Angkor et dix siècles d'art khmer" (Grand Palais, 1997), which for the first time brought together the masterpieces of Khmer sculpture from the Guimet Museum in Paris and the National Museum of Cambodia in Phnom Penh; "Trésors d'art du Vietnam, la sculpture du Champa" (in collaboration with Pierre Baptiste, Guimet Museum, 2005–2006); and "L'Âge d'or de l'Inde classique, l'Empire des Gupta" (Grand Palais, 2007).

In 2019, he conceived the illustrated catalogue for Buddha, The Golden Legend exhibition curated by Sophie Makariou, which took place at the Guimet Museum in Paris.

== Publications ==
- Thierry Zéphir; Valérie Zaleski; Maud Girard-Geslan; Marijke Klokke; Albert Le Bonheur; Donald Stadtner (1994). L'Art de l'Asie du Sud-Est. Collection « L'Art et les grandes civilisations » (in French). Paris: Citadelles & Mazenod. ISBN 9782850880629.
- L'Empire des rois khmers. Collection « Découvertes Gallimard » (nº 310) (in French). Paris: Éditions Gallimard. 1997. ISBN 9782070533947.
  - Khmer: Lost Empire of Cambodia. "New Horizons" series. Translated by Garvie, Francisca. London: Thames & Hudson. 1998. ISBN 9780500300848.
  - Khmer: The Lost Empire of Cambodia. "Abrams Discoveries" series. Translated by Garvie, Francisca. New York: Harry N. Abrams. 1998. ISBN 9780810928534.
- With C. Sivaramamurti, Amina Okada (1999). L'Art en Inde. Collection « L'Art et les grandes civilisations » (in French). Paris: Citadelles & Mazenod. ISBN 9782850880735.
- With Amina Okada (2007). L'Âge d'or de l'Inde classique. Collection « Découvertes Gallimard » (nº 506) (in French). Paris: Éditions Gallimard. ISBN 9782070341610.
- Angkor et ses temples (in French). Photography by Luca Invernizzi Tettoni. Paris: Les Éditions du Pacifique. 2005. ISBN 9782878680928.
- With Simon Delobel, Jérôme Ghesquière (2005). Missions archéologiques françaises au Vietnam : Les monuments du Champa photographie et itinéraires 1902-1904 (in French). Foreword by Jean-François Jarrige. Paris: Les Indes savantes. ISBN 9782846541220.
- With Pierre Baptiste (2005). Trésors d'art du Vietnam : La sculpture du Champa (in French). Paris: Réunion des Musées Nationaux. ISBN 9782903808679.
- With Pierre Baptiste (2009). Dvāravatī, aux sources du bouddhisme en Thaïlande (in French). Paris: Réunion des Musées Nationaux. ISBN 9782711855506.
- Bouddha, la légende dorée (in French). Paris: Lienart éditions. 2019. ISBN 9782359062892.
