= Autumn Mist =

1999 novel by David A. McIntee

- Author: David A. McIntee
- Series: Doctor Who book: Eighth Doctor Adventures
- Release number: 24
- Subject: Featuring: Eighth Doctor; Sam and Fitz
- Publisher: BBC Books
- Publication date: July 1999
- ISBN: 0-563-55583-1
- Preceded by: Unnatural History
- Followed by: Interference: Book One

Autumn Mist is an original novel written by David A. McIntee and based on the long-running British science fiction television series Doctor Who. It features the Eighth Doctor, Sam and Fitz.

== Plot ==
The Doctor investigates an ancient force interfering with the Battle of the Bulge.
