= Roger Donoghue =

American boxer

Personal information
- Nationality: American
- Born: November 20, 1930 Yonkers, New York, U.S.
- Died: August 20, 2006 (aged 75) Greenport, New York, U.S.
- Occupations: Professional boxer, boxing trainer
- Spouse: Faye Moore

Boxing career

Roger Donoghue (November 20, 1930 – August 20, 2006) was a prizefighter who taught Marlon Brando how to box for his role in the 1954 movie On the Waterfront.

Donoghue was born in Yonkers, New York. His father, an Irish immigrant, was a taxicab driver.

Donoghue began boxing in a ring set up in the back of a pool hall. He won 29 or 31 amateur bouts, and turned professional at age 18. Of his first 27 professional fights, he won 25. His purses covered college tuition for his brother and sister.

Donoghue's first fight in Madison Square Garden was on August 29, 1951. Donoghue's opponent was another 20-year-old, George Flores, whom he had knocked out in a match two weeks prior. Donoghue knocked out Flores in the eighth round. The blow resulted in Flores' death on September 3, 1951. Donoghue gave his winnings from that match to Flores' family, and New York instituted the requirement that boxers take a 30-day break from the ring after being knocked out.

A friend of Donoghue's, writer Budd Schulberg, once asked him how far he might have gone as a fighter if not for the Flores incident. "He said, 'Well, I was pretty good, but I have that Irish skin and I cut pretty easily. I guess I could have been a contender,'" Schulberg told the New York Daily News. "He didn't make a big deal of it, but it really stuck in my mind." And Schulberg used the line in his next screenplay, "On the Waterfront."

Director Elia Kazan agreed to pay Donoghue $75 a day to coach Brando in boxing. After Brando's first lesson, Donoghue said he had the actor "shooting straight jabs, and he's already learning to hook off the jab. I can make a hell of a middleweight out of his kid."

Donoghue also taught James Dean boxing moves in preparation for a role patterned after Donoghue in a film project that died when Dean was killed in an automobile wreck.

In 2006 Donoghue died in Greenport, New York of complications from Alzheimer's disease. His wife, Faye Moore a famous equestrian artist, reported his death to the press.
