= Khmer: The Lost Empire of Cambodia =

1997 book by Thierry Zéphir

- First French edition. Head of King Jayavarman VII.
- Author: Thierry Zéphir
- Original title: L'Empire des rois khmers
- Translator: Francisca Garvie
- Language: French
- Series: Découvertes Gallimard●Histoire (FR); Abrams Discoveries (US); New Horizons (UK)
- Release number: 310th in collection
- Subject: Art, culture and history of Khmer Kingdoms
- Genre: Nonfiction monograph
- Publisher: Éditions Gallimard (FR); Harry N. Abrams (US); Thames & Hudson (UK)
- Publication date: 13 February 1997
- Publication place: France
- English publication date: 1998
- Media type: Print (paperback)
- Pages: 128 pp.
- ISBN: 978-2-0705-3394-7
- OCLC: 1040463536
- Preceded by: Voyages en Provence, Alpes, Côte d'Azur
- Followed by: George Sand : Un diable de femme

Khmer: The Lost Empire of Cambodia (UK title: Khmer: Lost Empire of Cambodia; French: L'Empire des rois khmers, lit. 'The Empire of the Khmer Kings') is a 1997 illustrated monograph on the culture and history of Khmer Kingdoms. Written by Thierry Zéphir, a professor of the École du Louvre, and published by Éditions Gallimard as the 310th volume in their "Découvertes" collection, in collaboration with the Réunion des Musées Nationaux.

== Synopsis ==
From left: US and UK editions.

The book is a general introduction to Khmer art (mostly its sculpture), culture and history, spanning a period of eight centuries. Presented in the context of a continuity of Indian art and religions, an introduction of the legendary origins of Khmer Kingdoms is given in the first chapter. After a summary of the history of pre-Angkor period (Kingdoms of Funan and Zhenla) in the second chapter, Thierry Zéphir gives an account of the strong Indian influence upon Khmer world. He also touches on the subject of transcontinental trade, such as Roman intaglios and coins with an effigy of Antoninus Pius discovered in Óc Eo.

The 9th century saw the rise of the Angkorian Empire which is the highlight of this volume, the following two chapters are dedicated to temples, sculptures, narrative reliefs, along with kings and politics of this period. Two foldouts being incorporated in the fourth chapter, illustrating an Angkor Wat bas-relief scene of churning of the ocean of milk, and the watercolour drawings of east-west section and plan of Angkor Wat by Lucien Fournereau. The last chapter deals with Buddhist art and tradition, it ends with the reign of Ang Chan I and his son Paramaraja I during the post-Angkor period in the 16th century. The "Documents" section assembles a collection of excerpts from well-known texts on Khmer culture and history, including two authored by George Cœdès and one by Chou Ta-kuan.

== Contents ==
Body text

- Opening: Photographs of sculptures from Angkor Thom, Banteay Srei and Preah Khan, by Jaroslav Poncar (pp. 1–9)
- Chapter 1: "Land and Water" (pp. 13–21)
- Chapter 2: "The Beginnings of the Khmer World" (pp. 23–37)
- Chapter 3: "The First Kings of Angkor" (pp. 39–55)
- Chapter 4: "The Classical Age of Angkor" (pp. 57–77)
- Chapter 5: "The Triumph of Buddhism" (pp. 79–95)

Documents

1. The spread of Indian culture in Southeast Asia (pp. 98–99)
2. Inscriptions, the basis of our knowledge of history (pp. 100–103)
3. The customs of Cambodia (pp. 104–109)
4. Khmer bas-reliefs (pp. 110–113)
5. An uncertain legacy: the Khmer paradox (pp. 114–119)
- Further Reading (p. 120)
- List of Illustrations (pp. 121–124)
- Index (pp. 124–126)
- Acknowledgments/Photo Credits/Text Credits (p. 127)

== Reception ==
Elizabeth Moore wrote in the Bulletin of the School of Oriental & African Studies: "The book is small, making it easy to travel with. Every page has photographs, all well reproduced, with useful information in the captions. A few spreads become overly complex. For example, in the third chapter, examples of stone inscriptions have been laid over a pale blue background with enlarged letters of an inscription in white (pp. 42–3). A straightforward enlargement of the inscription would have been an interesting inclusion, and while the background is credited, it is not explained. However, like the earlier point on text generalizations, such instances are inevitable given the format of the book. The literature on Angkor in English is growing, with this volume a welcome addition."

The art historian Dawn F. Rooney gave a positive review to the book saying that this "small volume is readable and amply illustrated. Tracks the Khmer civilization from the beginning to its demise at Angkor in the mid-15th century. Includes documentation on inscriptions, bas-reliefs, and customs of Cambodia. Recommended for students. Written by a French scholar renowned for his work on Khmer art."

On Mekong Network, an anonymous reviewer opined that "this small, slender volume makes an excellent guidebook to Angkor, and to Khmer art in general. Beautifully designed and packed with gorgeous photos, it's less detailed but more accessible than the guides by Coedes or Henri Parmentier. Highly recommended".

Margaret J. Goldstein wrote in her book Cambodia in Pictures that "this lushly illustrated book examines the ancient Khmer Empire and especially the magnificent temples at Angkor".

== See also ==
- Bayon
- Khmer architecture
- Jayavarman II
- Suryavarman II
- Hinduism in Cambodia
- The Customs of Cambodia
- In the "Découvertes Gallimard" collection:
  - Angkor: Heart of an Asian Empire by Bruno Dagens
