= Sleepy (novel) =

1996 novel by Kate Orman

- Author: Kate Orman
- Cover artist: Mark Wilkinson
- Series: Doctor Who book: Virgin New Adventures
- Release number: 48
- Subject: Featuring: Seventh Doctor; Bernice, Chris, Roz
- Publisher: Virgin Books
- Publication date: March 1996
- ISBN: 0-426-20465-4
- Preceded by: Warchild
- Followed by: Death and Diplomacy

Sleepy is an original novel written by Kate Orman and based on the long-running British science fiction television series Doctor Who. It features the Seventh Doctor, Bernice, Chris and Roz. It is part of the "Psi Powers series".

== Synopsis ==
The Earth colony Yemaya 4 is struck by a plague that causes the colonists to manifest psychic powers. The Doctor and his companions become heavily involved. Some of the group contract the plague, while others travel back in time to try to find out how it started. Meanwhile, murderous agents threaten to simply kill every innocent person involved.
