= Greenport, New York =

Greenport, New York may refer to:

- Greenport, Columbia County, New York
- Greenport, Suffolk County, New York
