= The Room with No Doors =

1997 novel by Kate Orman

The Room With No Doors
- Author: Kate Orman
- Cover artist: Jon Sullivan
- Series: Doctor Who book: Virgin New Adventures
- Release number: 59
- Subject: Featuring: Seventh Doctor; Chris
- Publisher: Virgin Books
- Publication date: February 1997
- ISBN: 0-426-20500-6
- Preceded by: Eternity Weeps
- Followed by: Lungbarrow

The Room With No Doors is an original novel written by Kate Orman and based on the long-running British science fiction television series Doctor Who. It features the Seventh Doctor and Chris.

A missing scene, "Room With No Doors - Cutaway" appears in the charity anthology Shelf Life.

The novel features a Victorian time traveller, Penelope Gate. Later books in the BBC Eighth Doctor Adventures, such as Unnatural History (which Orman co-wrote) and The Gallifrey Chronicles, imply that she is the Doctor's human mother, whose existence is implied in the 1996 telemovie.
