= 'Asta Bowen =

American young adult writer

'Asta Brown
- Born: August 12, 1955 (age 71); Chicago, Illinois
- Education: St. Olaf College, 1977; Pacific University, 1993
- Occupation: Writer

'Asta Bowen (born August 12, 1955), sometimes spelled Asta Bowen, is an American young adult writer. She's best known for her novel Wolf: The Journey Home.

== Biography ==
Bowen was born in Chicago to a family of Irish descent. She was raised in Orland Park, Illinois. She published her first book, The Huckleberry Book in 1988. Nine years later, her best known work, Wolf: The Journey Home was published.

From 1988 to 2001, she published a column in the Seattle Post-Intelligencer. She has also written for the Salt Lake Tribune. She now teaches composition in Kalispell, Montana and lives in Somers, Montana.

== The wolf myth ==
Bowen writes young-adult fiction, with a focus on the myth of the wolf. In Wolf: The Journey Home, there is a scene where a wolf body allows to find the killer has been compared by American academic and professor S. K. Robisch to a real poaching in the Yellowstone Park, against one male of the Druids wolf pack, named from Druid Peak, the first reintroduced in this park in 1996, where the killer has been apprehended because he kept the head as a trophy. Robisch credits Bowen for her correct portrayal of the role of the den location, to raise the new litter. There is little anthropomorphism in this novel except for giving the wolves names like Marth or Oldtooth.

British historian Karen Jones, specialized in the history of the American West, environmental history and Animal Studies, stresses upon the importance of such works in the environmental values transmission. She notes works like 'Asta Bowen "contain descriptions of intelligent canine protagonists that countered the images of bestial excess in traditional Euro-American wolf tales.".

Jones also notes, more strongly than Robisch the "humanistic traits" of the wolves: in Wolf: The Journey Home, she sees Marta as an "eco-feminist icon, a strong female character" and as "totem for positive gender identity". She compares the myth to the Turner's Frontier Thesis: "Bowen's fictionalised rendition of lupine restoration involved copious quantities of pain, struggle, and death. This was a damming verdict on Turnerian triumphalism. Here the wolf story showed a West not won but lost. In Bowen's work, the wolf emerged as a potent signifier of frontier guilt, an expression that also proved common in commentary on the wolf reintroduction programme in Yellowstone in the mid-1990s."

== Work reception ==
Her first novel, Wolf: The Journey Home, is well received and was nominated for the 2006 Teens' Top Ten award by the American Library Association.

== Bibliography ==
- The Huckleberry Book (1988)
- Wolf: The Journey Home (1997)
