= Unnatural History (novel) =

1999 novel by Jonathan Blum and Kate Orman

- Author: Jonathan Blum and Kate Orman
- Series: Doctor Who book: Eighth Doctor Adventures
- Release number: 23
- Subject: Featuring: Eighth Doctor; Sam and Fitz
- Publisher: BBC Books
- Publication date: June 1999
- ISBN: 0-563-55576-9
- Preceded by: Dominion
- Followed by: Autumn Mist

Unnatural History is an original novel written by Jonathan Blum and Kate Orman and based on the long-running British science fiction television series Doctor Who. It features the Eighth Doctor, Sam, Fitz and Faction Paradox.

== Plot ==
In London during the year 2002, dark-haired Sam Jones is living a normal life, though struggling with a drug addiction, when the Eighth Doctor arrives in the shop she works in and tells her that she should have blonde hair and be travelling with him. Shocked by this, she runs out onto the street to get away from him and is attacked by a ten-year-old boy, who claims that she shouldn't exist. When the Doctor rescues her, she agrees to go with him to San Francisco. When they arrive, the Doctor finds Fitz and explains that when the TARDIS destroyed the Earth, but reversed time, a scar in space and time was left behind and strange creatures from other dimensions are being attracted by it. The TARDIS has become trapped inside the scar, and will be crushed by the strain of trying to stabilise the scar in three days unless it is removed. When the Doctor originally arrived, blonde Sam fell in the scar, and dark Sam appeared in London.

The Doctor's sees the boy again, who reveals that he is a member of Faction Paradox, claiming that he isn't here to harm the Doctor, just to observe his actions. Later the Doctor notices a Kraken in the bay, which will destroy the city looking for food if it detects the energy coming from the scar, but the TARDIS is currently blocking it from detecting them. The Doctor finds a scientist called Joyce who promises to help repair the equipment needed to close the scar. The Doctor tells Sam that her biodata is vulnerable to change from the pulses coming from the scar.

One of Fitz's contacts kidnaps them and delivers them to a man who fits them with tracking devices and releases them. In Golden Gate Park the Doctor discovers lines of his own biodata lying exposed on the ground, and seeing this removes the tracking devices. The Doctor now realizes that the man who kidnapped them was from the higher dimensions, and has been experimenting with the Doctor's biodata. The Doctor learns that the man's name is Griffin, and traps him, who explains that his ambition is to categorize every creature in the universe. Griffin then escapes; and at the hotel, Griffin's henchmen kidnap Fitz, but accidentally leave Sam behind.

After learning that Fitz has been kidnapped, the Doctor confronts Griffin, who explains that he wants to see the Kraken destroy the city. Sam attempts to rescue him, but Griffin takes a sample of her biodata before they both escape. Joyce finishes repairing the Doctor's equipment. Returning to the scar, the Doctor finds his equipment can't close the scar and will only remove the TARDIS from the scar, which will enable the Kraken to destroy the city, so the Doctor decides to sacrifice the TARDIS to seal the scar.

Griffin goes to the scar and tries to edit the Doctor and Sam's biodata, but the Doctor threatens to alter the higher dimensions that Griffin lives in. Griffin releases Fitz, but Fitz then attacks Griffin and traps him in his dimensionally transcendental specimen box. The Doctor pulls the TARDIS out of the scar, causing the Kraken to look for food. The Doctor places a machine to distract the Kraken on the bay, and the boy offers to create a paradox, but the Doctor refuses. Back at the scar, Sam jumps in, turning her into blonde Sam. The Doctor frees Griffin's specimens from the box, who attack Griffin and push him into the scar. Sam throws the specimen box into the scar after him, causing it to close, and which causes dark Sam to cease to exist and the Kraken and the other creatures return to their own dimension.

The boy explains that blonde Sam is a paradox, because blonde Sam was created when dark Sam threw herself in amongst the Doctor's biodata in the scar, but she was only able to do so because the Doctor brought her to the scar he'd created. Now he has no shadow, like the other Faction members, and the boy tells him that he will soon be a Faction member.

== Writing and development ==
Orman and Blum were newly married when they were writing the book. Orman described it as "an absolute cow to write".

The book introduces the character variant of Dark Sam to the series, a dark-haired drug-using version of the character from an alternative history.

It is implied that Professor Daniel Joyce is the Doctor's father. His name is a reference to various un-made Doctor Who scripts that gave the Doctor's father's name as Ulysses and the book of the same name's author, James Joyce. This is the first reference to the character, but in the final Eighth Doctor book The Gallifrey Chronicles, a flashback shows a Time Lord character called Ulysses also working with someone called Larna and a human called Penelope who might be the Doctor's human mother. Joyce's assistant Larna, may be the same Larna from The Infinity Doctors as several other plot points from The Infinity Doctors are mentioned briefly in the book.
