= Vegetarian Cooking for Everyone =

1997 cookbook by Deborah Madison

- Author: Deborah Madison
- Illustrator: Catherine Kirkwood, Laurie Smith (photographs)
- Language: English
- Published: 1997 (Broadway Books)
- Publication place: United States
- Media type: Print (hardback)
- Pages: 742
- ISBN: 9780767900140
- OCLC: 36647876

Vegetarian Cooking for Everyone is a 1997 cookbook by Deborah Madison. It contains 1,400 vegetarian recipes from soups to desserts.

== Reception ==
In 2017 Washington Post Food Editor Joe Yonan listed it as one of three must-have classic vegetarian cookbooks.

In a review of Vegetarian Cooking For Everyone, Gourmet magazine wrote "Before you even read a word, the clean type, elegant, well-organized layout, and helpful illustrations reassure you that you won't be pulling your hair out trying to follow a recipe. And then Madison's warm, knowledgeable prose pulls you in."

Michael Ruhlman noted "For all these reasons, in the 17 years I've been writing about cooks and cooking, I have purchased a single cookbook, several years ago, for myself, a single book to inspire me and broaden my culinary imagination: "Vegetarian Cooking for Everyone," by Deborah Madison, .." and The New Yorker "found Madison to be a charming and non-threatening psychopomp into the realm of what I imagined to be the half-dead, the eaters of what she frequently calls “plant food,” which, to me, sounded like “fish food.”"

Publishers Weekly gave a starred review writing "Many have tried to create a reliable, encyclopedic vegetarian cookbook, but few have succeeded. Madison (The Greens Cookbook; The Savory Way) comes through with a weighty volume.." and called it an "incredibly complete and triumphant effort."

== Awards ==
- 1998 IACP Cookbook of the Year - winner
- 1998 James Beard Vegetarian Book Award - winner
- 2008 Gourmet August Cookbook Club Pick
- 2016 James Beard Cookbook Hall of Fame

== The New Vegetarian Cooking for Everyone ==
In 2014 Madison published a revised version about which The Wall Street Journal wrote "Ms. Madison shows herself to be a formidable teacher not just of vegetarian cooking but of imaginative cooking generally."

== See also ==
- Vegetarian cuisine
