= The Door in the Lake =

1997 novel by Nancy Butts

- First edition
- Author: Nancy Butts
- Language: English
- Genre: Science fiction
- Published: 1997 by Front Street
- Publication place: United States
- Pages: 159
- ISBN: 9781886910270
- OCLC: 36629937

The Door in the Lake is a children's science fiction novel by Nancy Butts, first published in 1997. It is a story about loss of time and identity.

== Plot summary ==
Twelve-year-old Joey Finney vanishes while camping with his family. When he comes back, he cannot remember what happened during the two years he was missing – or why he has not grown. Then he starts to have seizures and seems to remember what happened. He believes that he was abducted by aliens. What could be the explanation for all of this?

== Reception ==
Publishers Weekly said that "the plot is slim and standard issue science fiction (and, in its observations of the Finney household, it may also owe a debt to Caroline Cooney's The Face on the Milk Carton and Whatever Happened to Janie?). Butts grounds the paranormal actions in the details of everyday life, and wraps up the story with a water-tight climax. An agreeable diversion for UFO enthusiasts."

Carrie Schadle in her review for School Library Journal said that "the action and resolution of the story are fairly compressed and taut, and as for the believability—who's to say?—we're talking alien abduction here, but the details are convincingly written." She also voiced concerns about the main character meeting someone he has met on-line, after concealing this from his parents - "be aware that this one element can all too often lead to tragedy in the real world."

Kirkus Reviews said that "Although the plot is disjointed and contrivance-driven, Joey's feeling of dislocation, and the discomfort others feel in his presence, is credibly presented... it's rare to find stories for young people about closer encounters that aren't played for laughs."

This novel was a Scholastic Book Club selection and was also chosen by the ALA as a Quick Pick for Reluctant Readers.

== Awards ==
- Quick Picks for Reluctant YA Readers (1999)
- Sequoia Young Adult Master List (2001)
- Sunshine State Young Reader's Award Reading List (2001)

== See also ==
- Alien abduction
- Flight of the Navigator, a film with a similar premise
