= Anastasia Gosteva =

Russian writer, journalist and translator

Anastasia Sergeyevna Gosteva (Russian: Анастасия Сергеевна Гостева; born 2 February 1975) is a Russian writer, journalist and translator who since the late 1990s has published a number of successful novels. Her imaginative story Big Bang and Turtles has been published in English online with support from UNESCO.

== Biography ==
Born in Moscow, Gosteva is a physics graduate (1997) from Moscow University. She is one of the first generation of writers who were able to travel freely after the Soviet Union was dissolved in 1991. In addition to her work as a journalist and translator, she publishes poetry and novels. In 1997, she won Znamya Magazine's Best Debut Novel award for Дочь самурая (The Samurai's Daughter). The short novel is the story of the heroine's travels to the West, including Paris and London: an innovative scenario for a Russian narrative. She went on to publish Travel Агнец (Travel Lamb) in 1998 and, more recently, Дух дома дома (The Den of the Enlightened) in 2008. She has also published a number of short stories in literary magazines.

Gosteva is a great traveller, especially to the Orient. She has been to India and the relatively unknown Mustang District of Nepal, and has discussed Buddhism with the Dalai Lama. It was on the basis of this experience that Lyudmila Ulitskaya invited her to write a story based on cosmogony. Her fantastic tale Большой взрыв и черепахи (2006), translated by Boris Meshcheryakov as Big Bang and Turtles, has now been published online by UNESCO. The book, presented as a children's fairy tale, tells the story of how little Cyril enters the mysterious home of an eccentric professor whose mission is to stop people quarrelling about their many different religions.
