= Connie Deanovich =

American poet

Connie Deanovich (born 1960) is an American poet.

She lived in Chicago. She now lives in Madison, Wisconsin.

Her work appeared in Bomb, Grand Street, New American Writing, Parnassus, See, Sulfur.

== Awards ==
- 1997 Whiting Award
- GE Award for Younger Writers.

== Works ==
- "from THE SPOTTED MOON"; "THE FRONTIER AND THE BACH FRONTIER", Mad Poetry
- "Formerly Communist Love Sonnet", Poetry Foundation
- "Little Is Known About the Mantella Expectata"; "Red, Gray, Black, and White Scarf"; " The 100 Miguels", David Trinidad Edition
- Zombie Jet. Zoland Books. 1999. ISBN 978-1-58195-010-6.
- Watusi Titanic. Timken. 1996-01-01. ISBN 978-0-943221-24-3.

=== Anthologies ===
- Gerald Costanzo; Jim Daniels, eds. (2000). American poetry: the next generation. Carnegie Mellon University Press. ISBN 978-0-88748-343-1.
- Jim Elledge; Susan Swartwout, eds. (1999). "from Ephemera Today on "All My Children"". Real things: an anthology of popular culture in American poetry. Indiana University Press. p. 166. ISBN 978-0-253-21229-0. "Connie Deanovich."
- Walk on the Wild Side: Contemporary Urban Poetry. Scribner. 1994. ISBN 978-0-684-19623-7.
- Nicholas Christopher, ed. (1989). Under 35: the new generation of American poets. Anchor Book. ISBN 978-0-385-26035-0.
