= S. Muthukrishnan (computer scientist) =

Indian computer scientist

- Education: New York University, PhD (1994)
- Scientific career
- Fields: Computer science
- Workplaces: Amazon (company)
- Thesis: Searching for Strings and Searching in Presence of Lies (1994)
- Doctoral advisor: Krishna Palem and Joel Spencer

S. ("Muthu") Muthukrishnan is a computer scientist of Indian origin, known for his work in streaming algorithms, auction design, and pattern matching. He is vice president of sponsored products, Amazon Advertising.

Previously, he was a professor of computer science at Rutgers University.

== Education ==
Muthukrishnan obtained his Ph.D. in 1994 New York University under the supervision of Krishna Palem and Joel Spencer.

== Research contributions ==
Muthukrishnan was general chair of the 1st ACM Conference on Online Social Networks. He was conference chair of the 5th IEEE International Conference on Data Mining (ICDM) in 2005 and co-chair of the 15th Annual Combinatorial Pattern Matching Symposium (CPM) in 2004. He was the organizer of the Big Data Program at the Simons Center for Theoretical Computer Science.

== Awards and honors ==
Muthukrishnan was inducted as an ACM Fellow in 2010 "For contributions to efficient algorithms for string matching, data streams, and internet ad auctions". He received the 2014 Imre Simon Test-of-Time Award at the LATIN Conference.

== Selected publications ==
- Muthukrishnan, S (2005), "Data streams: Algorithms and applications" (PDF), Foundations and Trends in Theoretical Computer Science, 1 (2): 117–236, doi:10.1561/0400000002, S2CID 145349.
- Cormode, Graham; Muthukrishnan, S. (2005), "An improved data stream summary: the count-min sketch and its applications", Journal of Algorithms, 55 (1): 58–75, doi:10.1016/j.jalgor.2003.12.001.
- Gravano, Luis; Ipeirotis, Panagiotis; Jagadish, Hosagrahar Visvesvaraya; Koudas, Nick; Muthukrishnan, S.; Srivastava, Divesh (2001), "Approximate string joins in a database (almost) for free", VLDB: 491–500.
