= The Last Party =

1997 book by Adele Morales

The Last Party: Scenes From My Life with Norman Mailer
- Author: Adele Morales
- Language: English
- Subject: Norman Mailer
- Genre: Memoir
- Publisher: Barricade Books
- Publication date: 1997
- Publication place: United States
- Pages: 380 pp.
- ISBN: 1-569-800-987
- OCLC: 35758291

The Last Party: Scenes From My Life with Norman Mailer is a 1997 book by Adele Morales, second wife of Norman Mailer, whom she married in 1954. It was published in the US by Barricade Books.

The book is a memoir of Morales' and Mailer's marriage; among other things, it outlines an incident Saturday, November 19, 1960, when Mailer stabbed her with a penknife at a party. He cut through her breast, only just missing her heart. Then he stabbed her in the back. As she lay there, hemorrhaging, one man reached down to help her. He snapped: "Get away from her. Let the bitch die." He was involuntarily committed to Bellevue Hospital for 17 days; his wife would not press charges, and he later pleaded guilty to a reduced charge of assault, and was given a suspended sentence. Morales was admitted to University Hospital in Manhattan for treatment of her injuries. In the short term, Morales made a partial physical recovery. She divorced Mailer in 1962 as a result of the incident. The stabbing incident has been a focal point for feminist critics of Mailer, who point to themes of sexual violence in his work.
