= Deborah Madison =

American chef

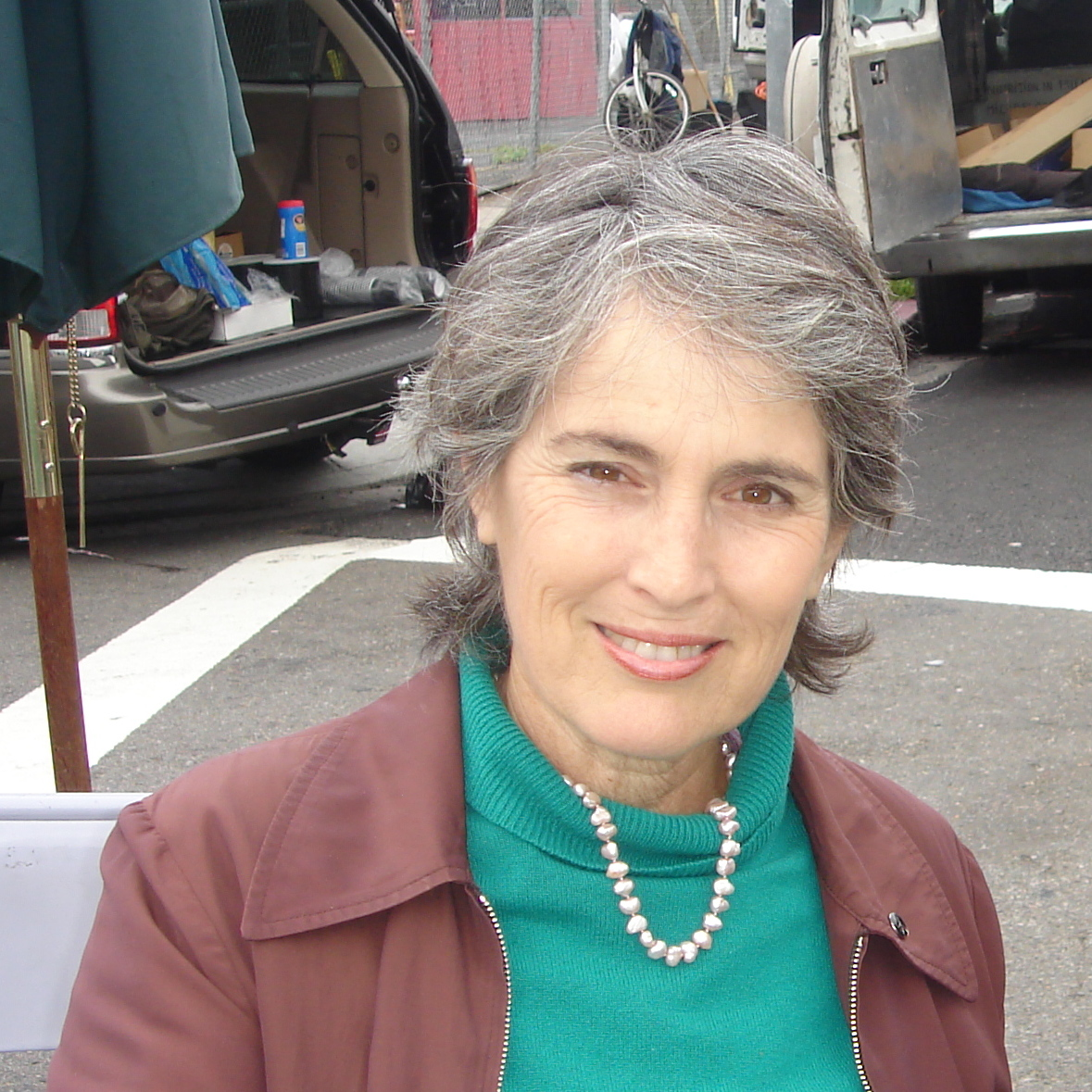
Deborah Madison (2013)

Deborah Madison is an American chef, writer, food activist, and cooking teacher. She has been called an expert on vegetarian cooking, although she is not a strict vegetarian. Her gourmet repertoire showcases fresh garden produce. Her work also highlights Slow Food, local foods and farmers' markets.

== Early years ==
Madison grew up in Davis, California, and earned a bachelor's degree with high honors in sociology/city planning in 1968 from Cowell College at the University of California, Santa Cruz. She then cooked at Chez Panisse and was a student for eighteen years at the San Francisco Zen Center. She was the founding chef at Greens Restaurant in San Francisco which opened in 1979. She then cooked for a year at the American Academy in Rome, Italy.

== Cookbooks ==
Madison, whose work concentrates on local foods and farmers' markets, returned to the Bay Area to write The Greens Cookbook with co-author Edward Espe Brown, and then wrote another 10 books on food and cooking, including Vegetarian Cooking for Everyone, This Can't Be Tofu, Local Flavors, Cooking and Eating From America's Farmers' Market and Seasonal Fruit Desserts from Orchard, Farm and Market, and Vegetable Literacy.

== Other writing ==
She has written for the magazines Gourmet, Saveur, Food and Wine, Kitchen Gardener, Fine Cooking, Orion, Organic Gardening and Eating Well, and for the Time-Life Cookbook Series. She has also written for Martha Stewart Living, Bon Appetite, Diversions, Kiplingers, Garden Design, Kitchen Garden, Cooks, Vegetarian Times, Metropolitan Home, East-West Journal, the Los Angeles Times, Home and Garden, and the International Slow Food Journal.

== New Mexico ==
Madison lives in Galisteo, New Mexico with her husband, artist Patrick McFarlin, who co-authored and illustrated their book What We Eat When We Eat Alone.

When she first moved to New Mexico, Madison managed the Santa Fe Farmers' Market and served on its board for a number of years. Madison has been active in the Slow Food movement, founded the Santa Fe Chapter, was active on the ARK committee and served on the scientific committee of the Slow Food Foundation for Biodiversity.

She has been on the board of the Seed Savers Exchange and the Southwest Grassfed Livestock Association, and was co-director of the Edible Kitchen garden at Monte del Sol Charter School in Santa Fe, New Mexico. She was a founder of Santa Fe's Café Escalara with chef David Tanis and restauranteur Brian Knox.

== Awards and honors ==
Madison received the André Simon Memorial Prize in 1987 and the M. F. K. Fisher Mid-Career Award in 1994. In addition, her cookbooks have received awards from the International Association of Culinary Professionals (IACP) and Les Dames d'Escoffie. Her first two both were named the Julia Child Cookbook of the Year by the IACP.

Madison has won five James Beard Foundation Awards, including two for her 1997 cookbook Vegetarian Cooking for Everyone (one in 1998 - James Beard Vegetarian Book Award, and one in 2016 - James Beard Cookbook Hall of Fame). She received four additional nominations, and was inducted into the James Beard Foundation's "Who's Who of Food and Beverage in America" in 2005.

== Bibliography ==
- Madison, Deborah; Edward Espe Brown (1987). The Greens Cookbook. ISBN 978-0553051957.
- Madison, Deborah (1990). The Savory Way. ISBN 978-0553057805.
- Madison, Deborah (1996). The Vegetarian Table. Chronicle Books. ISBN 978-0811808880.
- Madison, Deborah (1997). Vegetarian Cooking for Everyone. ISBN 978-0767900140. (James Beard Award Winner)
- Madison, Deborah (2000). This Can't Be Tofu!. National Geographic Books. ISBN 978-0767904193. (James Beard Award Nominee)
- Madison, Deborah (2002). Local Flavors: Cooking and Eating from America's Farmers' Markets. ISBN 978-0767903493. (James Beard Award Winner)
- Madison, Deborah (2005). Vegetarian Suppers from Deborah Madison's Kitchen. ISBN 978-0767916271. (James Beard Award Nominee)
- Madison, Deborah (2006). Vegetable Soups From Deborah Madison's Kitchen. ISBN 978-0767916288. (James Beard Award Nominee)
- Madison, Deborah; McFarlin, Patrick (2009). What We Eat When We Eat Alone. Gibbs Smith. ISBN 978-1423604969.
- Madison, Deborah (2010). Seasonal Fruit Desserts. ISBN 978-0767916295.
- Madison, Deborah (2013). Vegetable Literacy. Clarkson Potter/Ten Speed. ISBN 978-1607741916. (James Beard Award Winner)
- Madison, Deborah (2017). In My Kitchen. Clarkson Potter/Ten Speed. ISBN 978-0-399-57888-5. (James Beard Award Nominee)
- Madison, Deborah (2020). An Onion in My Pocket. Knopf Doubleday Publishing. ISBN 978-0525656029.
