= Wolf: The Journey Home =

Young adult fiction novel

- First edition cover, published in 1997
- Author: 'Asta Bowen
- Original title: Hungry for Home: A Wolf Odyssey
- Illustrator: Jane Hart Meyer
- Language: English
- Genre: Young adult fiction
- Publisher: Simon & Schuster
- Publication date: January 13, 1997
- Publication place: United States
- Media type: Print (hardcover)
- Pages: 218 pp (first edition)
- ISBN: 978-0-684-82361-4
- OCLC: 35029612

Wolf: The Journey Home, originally titled Hungry for Home: A Wolf Odyssey, is a 1997 American young adult novel written by 'Asta Bowen. Originally published by Simon & Schuster with line drawings by Jane Hart Meyer, it was retitled and reprinted without illustrations in 2006 by Bloomsbury Publishing. Based on true accounts of the Pleasant Valley, Montana, wolf pack, the novel traces the life of a female alpha wolf named Marta after the forced relocation of her pack in 1989 to an unfamiliar territory. Terrified, Marta abandons her pack and begins a journey in search of her home; she eventually arrives in Ninemile Valley, where she finds a new mate with whom she starts a new pack.

Bowen was prompted to write the story of the relocated wolves after becoming outraged over the continued poaching of wolves in the protected areas of Ninemile Valley. She spent four years researching wolves while working on the novel. In recounting the fates of the animals at the end, she expresses hope in the ideals behind efforts to restore wolf populations. Nominated for a 2006 Teens' Top Ten award by the American Library Association, the novel was praised by critics. Two praised Bowen's ability to avoid anthropomorphism while capturing the essence of wolf behavior and life. Another also praised the story's highlighting of the difficulties in wolf relocation programs.

== Plot ==
Marta, a black gray wolf, is alpha female in a small pack in Pleasant Valley, Montana, that consists of her mate, Calef, their three pups Rann, Sula, and Annie, and a seven-year-old wolf named Oldtooth. One morning Calef is killed by poachers, leaving Marta and Oldtooth to try to feed and raise the pups on their own. Though an experienced hunter, Oldtooth is unable to bring down large game as he lost most of his teeth chewing a steel leg trap off his leg years ago. Once the cubs are old enough to be left alone for short periods of time, Marta takes over the bulk of the hunting. Though it is difficult, the two adults successfully keep all three cubs alive and begin weaning them and teaching them the ways of the wolf. In the summer, traps begin appearing in the area as human populations increase. Annie and Sula are caught and are taken away by humans, but reappear a few days later, locked in cages. Marta tries to free her pups but is unsuccessful; however humans come regularly to keep them fed and ensure they have water. Oldtooth is later captured, while Marta is tranquilized from a helicopter. Rann escapes and is not seen again.

The wolves are kept in a human facility for a couple of months to be examined, and a wound on Oldtooth's paw is treated. In early winter, the wolves are sedated again and awaken to find themselves in a strange high place with radio collars around their necks. Still groggy from the tranquilizer, the strangeness of the events and the smell of grizzly bear in the area triggers Marta's flight instincts and she runs blindly downward, leaving Oldtooth and the cubs behind. When Oldtooth awakens, he quietly abandons Annie and Sula, following Marta's trail, but at a much slower pace.

Marta continues running in the direction she believes will lead back to Pleasant Valley, swimming across Middle Fork River, crossing the nearby highway and railroad tracks, and running through various woodlands in between. Pausing only to drink water and tend her paws, she crosses Pyramid Peak and swims across the Hungry Horse Reservoir, before a week without food and exhaustion cause her to collapse on the shore. After resting, she continues her run, though hunger now spurs her to pause to hunt when she can but she eventually collapses by Flathead Lake, where she remains unconscious for days. Meanwhile, unskilled at hunting and without the adults to teach them how to survive, Annie and Sula slowly starve to death. Oldtooth reaches Middle Fork Valley, where illness and his lame foot drive him to hunt local livestock. He is shot and killed by a human.

When Marta recovers, her instincts to return home are dulled and she begins traveling more slowly. She makes her way through Swan Valley to cross the Swan Range and Mission Mountains. As winter settles in, she makes a winter home around Lindbergh Lake, where hunting is good and humans few. Near the end of winter, she meets another lone wolf, Greatfoot, a large male. Initially they maintain their distance from one another, until Greatfoot hunts the elk herd in Marta's range, specifically the aging leader that Marta favored and refused to hunt herself. She stops the other wolf's hunt, and after a brief skirmish they forget the elk and become friendly. They form a pack of two and leave the area, heading south. After mating, their travels become more urgent to find a home to raise young.

They settle in Ninemile Valley, a large forested region that while inhabited by humans, has few roads and homes. Several weeks after they make their den, Marta gives birth to seven pups, though one dies shortly after birth. As spring arrives, the pups grow well under their parents care and begin making their first explorations outside of the den. In early summer, Marta leaves the den to hunt and is killed by a poacher. Greatfoot is left as the sole provider for the pups. Though they were not fully weaned, they soon learn to eat the meat their father provides and he slowly begins teaching them how to avoid humans and how to survive. The only human the pack ignores is a human scent they frequently find on their trails, as no human ever appears with it, only the occasional sound of a truck nearby.

Near the end of summer, Greatfoot is run over and killed while crossing a freeway during a hunt. The pups begin hearing a strange wolf howl, but when they track it they find a fresh kill and the familiar human scent. New kills appear every few days as the young wolves grow larger and stronger. One night when they hear the unusual howl, they are closer than usual to it and reach the kill in time to meet their benefactor, a human male. The pack stares at the man, before disappearing back into the forest, ignoring his howl. As he goes to leave, however, the six return to the edge of the clearing and howl.

== Development and publication ==
According to Bowen, she was "not a wolf person" before penning Wolf: The Journey Home. A language arts teacher at Flathead High School in northwest Montana and a former op-ed columnist for the Seattle Post-Intelligencer, she stated that she read news reports about the Pleasant Valley wolf pack in the Daily Inter Lake, but it was the death of one of the Ninemile pups that spurred her to write the novel. In her words, it was "one death too many" from the many non-accidental deaths of the wolves, and she felt the "story needed to be told". She spent four years studying wolves in preparation for writing the novel, particularly the lives of a pack of wolves that were part of the federal wolf relocation program and who were documented in records kept by the United States Fish and Wildlife Service. The pack formed in the spring of 1989 in Pleasant Valley, Montana. As in the novel, the alpha male was killed, mistaken for a dog by a rancher, and the rest of the pack was trapped, except the one pup that escaped. They were held in Kalispell until they could be transferred to Glacier Park. Using radio collars, biologists were able to track the pack members from their release to their eventual fates, as depicted in the novel. The pups born to Marta and Greatfoot were born in Spring 1990 in Ninemile Valley, an area near Missoula. When they stopped receiving a signal for Marta, authorities searched for her body for weeks until her broken radio collar was found in a creek. Mike Jimenez, then a wildlife biologist and the Wyoming Wolf Recovery Project Leader, was the man in the blue truck who tracked and monitored the pack in the novel and fed the pups after the death of Greatfoot.

"...I walked the mounts these wolves walked; I studied wolf science; I interviewed wildlife biologists; I studied maps and drew diagrams; I played with captive pups and had my coffee cup stolen by a quick-witted mom. As I learned, I wrote: badly at first, but better as I learned the ways of the wolf, the lives of these wolves, and the shape of their story."

— 'Asta Bowen, Wolf: The Journey Home

The novel, then titled Hungry for Home: A Wolf Odyssey, was first published by Simon & Schuster in hardback format on January 13, 1997. The first edition included ink illustrations by Jane Hart Meyer. The novel was reprinted in paperback format on January 30, 1998. The novel later went out of print, after enjoying modest success in the Netherlands. A few years later, Bowen's attorney convinced her to rework the novel for young-adult readers, and on December 27, 2005, Bloomsbury USA reprinted the edited novel with the new title of Wolf: The Journey Home in hardback format, without the illustrations of the previous edition and with a new photographic cover. The new edition of the novel has been translated and reprinted in China.

=== Aftermath ===
Jimenez stopped feeding the pups after Thanksgiving that same year. Though the pups learned to hunt, Silver and Pikuni left the pack and the other four began killing livestock. They were captured to be relocated, much as their parents had been. One, Camas, escaped after waking up from the tranquilizer early. Chinook was killed for continuing to hunt livestock and Timber was killed by a poacher. Tenino, who also continued hunting livestock, was recaptured and sent to Wolf Haven International, a sanctuary in Washington State, where he lived until his death in 2001. The fates of the other cubs, as well as Rann, the cub who escaped the initial relocation, are unknown. In the epilogue of the novel, Bowen expresses hope that they survived and bred, enabling the bloodlines started with Marta and Greatfoot to continue in the wolf packs that now inhabit the area. Jimenez continued working as the Wyoming Wolf Recovery Project Leader for the United States Fish and Wildlife Service until 2008, when he was selected to be the Wyoming Game and Fish Department's Wolf Program Coordinator.

== Reception ==
Wolf: The Journey Home was nominated for the 2006 Teens' Top Ten award by the American Library Association. Publishers Weekly's Sybil Steinberg called it a "powerful first novel" and a "genuinely eye-opening tale". She praised Bowen for "striving to inhabit the wild psyche of Marta with a minimum of anthropomorphic sentimentality," and felt the author conveyed "both a reverence for the ways of the wild and a realistic grasp of wolves' fear of humans." Reviewing the title for The Detroit Free Press, Judy Rose considered it a "fact-and-fiction book" written "with a wolf's-eye view". She praised the work's factual basis and Bowen's extensive research into the topic, and felt the novel's release was "well-timed", coinciding with growing interest in wolf research and the reintroduction programs, particularly those at Yellowstone Park. While noting the novel is not for everyone, she felt it would be enjoyable to "wildlife lovers" and that readers will "howl with [the wolves] pain". David Seideman of the Chicago Tribune considered the novel to be in the same "vein [as] the classic The Incredible Journey", praising the author's "faithfully [capturing of] their indomitable spirit". He thought that "Bowen's first-rate skills as a nature writer keep her from falling off the edge into anthropomorphism", though he criticized the scenes in which Marta refuses to hunt and even defends an old buck, feeling that she allowed "her sympathies to distort reality" and contradicted her own assertion that wolves are "always looking for an easy meal." Jennifer Henderson, of the Booklist, found it to be a "memorable tale" that highlights the difficulties in reintroducing wolves even to protected areas. Calling it a "beautifully told wolf story" with a "tragic outcome", she recommended the novel for teenage readers who love animals. In Gentle Reads: Great Books to Warm Hearts and Lift Spirits, Deanna McDaniel recommends the novel in her list of 500 inspiring stories for young adults, considering it to be an engaging and "vivid" tale of survival that contains a "strong message of hope" in the legacy Marta leaves behind.
