= Aqiil Gopee =

Mauritian writer and poet (born 1997)

Aqiil Gopee (born 22 June 1997) is a Mauritian writer and poet.

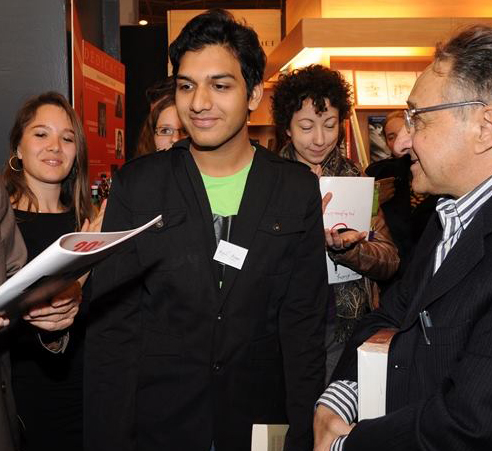
Aqiil Gopee at the PJEF 2014 Proclamation of Laureates

His first novella, La Pièce, was published in 2012 after reception of a jury mention at the Prix du Livre d'Or (2011) competition organised by the Municipality of Quatre-Bornes and presided over by Ananda Devi. Two other books, Fantômes, a collection of short-stories (prefaced by Ananda Devi) and Orgasmes (a collection of poems) came out in 2013, and in 2014, he was proclaimed laureate of the Prix du jeune écrivain de langue française in France for his short-story 'Loup et Rouge', a re-writing of the tale of the Little Red Riding Hood, and subsequently invited to the Salon du Livre de Paris to attend the 'Écrire à 20 ans' panel. Other awards include The S.I.C.O.M Youth Excellence Award For The Promotion of Literature (2014) and The Prix Jean-Fanchette des Jeunes (2015). His texts are studied at the University of Mauritius.

== Published works ==
- La Pièce, novel, Edilivre, 2012
- Les Hurleuses, short-story, Je Suis Un Vieux Peau-Rouge Qui Ne Marchera Jamais Dans Une File Indienne, L'Atelier d'Écriture, 2012
- Sous Terre, short-story, Collection Maurice, Immedia, 2012
- Fantômes, short-story collection,(preface by Ananda Devi), L'Atelier d'Écriture, 2013
- Orgasmes, poetry collection, L'Atelier d'Écriture, 2013
- L'homme et la guitare, short-story Collection Maurice, Immedia, 2013
- Loup et Rouge, short-story Sornettes ou Vérité et autres nouvelles, Buchet-Chastel, 2014
- Wolves, Dawn, poems, Anthologie de la Poésie Mauricienne Contemporaine d'Expression Française, Acoria, 2014
- Libellules, short story, Prix Jean-Fanchette des Jeunes, L'Atelier d'Écriture, 2015
- Electricity, short-story Collection Maurice, Immedia, 2015

== Awards and distinctions ==
- Special Mention, Prix du Livre d’Or for 'La Pièce', 2011
- Special Mention, Prix de Poésie Point Barre, for Wolves, 2013
- Best Local Writer, National Drama Festival of Mauritius, 2013
- Laureate of the Prix International du Jeune Écrivain de Langue Française for 'Loup et Rouge', 2014
- AEFE Award for 'Loup et Rouge', 2014
- S.I.C.O.M Youth Excellence Award, Mauritius, 2014
- Prix Jean-Fanchette des Jeunes, 2015
- Laureate of the Prix International du Jeune Écrivain de Langue Française for 'La Porte en Fer', 2016
- Laureate (1st prize) of the Prix International du Jeune Écrivain de Langue Française for 'Insectarium', 2023
