= The Year of Intelligent Tigers =

2001 novel by Kate Orman

- Author: Kate Orman
- Series: Doctor Who book: Eighth Doctor Adventures
- Release number: 46
- Subject: Featuring: Eighth Doctor; Fitz and Anji
- Publisher: BBC Books
- Publication date: June 2001
- Pages: 288
- ISBN: 0-563-53831-7
- Preceded by: Eater of Wasps
- Followed by: The Slow Empire

The Year of Intelligent Tigers is a BBC Books original novel written by Kate Orman and based on the long-running British science fiction television series Doctor Who. It features the Eighth Doctor, Fitz and Anji. It was also reprinted in 2011, along with a few other books in the series.

== Synopsis ==
The alien world of Hitchemus is known for its animal sanctuaries and the musical talents of the citizens. Now the animals have escaped, a hurricane is threatening everyone and the humans do not want the Doctor's assistance. His companions are left to deal with the situation when the Doctor vanishes into the wild.
