= Kate Orman =

Australian author (born 1968)

- Born: 1968 (age 57–58); Sydney, New South Wales, Australia
- Spouse: Jonathan Blum

Kate Orman (born 1968) is an Australian author, best known for her books connected to the British science-fiction television series Doctor Who.

== Biography ==
Kate Orman was born in Sydney, but grew up in Canberra and Melbourne and spent two years living in the United States. She earned a degree in biology at Sydney University before becoming a professional author.

She is married to American writer Jonathan Blum, whom she met through Doctor Who fandom.

== Writing ==
Orman penned many spin-off novels from Doctor Who for Virgin Publishing, BBC Books and Telos Publishing, the first non-British and first female author to do so. Several of her later Doctor Who works were in collaboration with her husband. She has also collaborated with Paul Cornell: Orman and Cornell co-plotted Human Nature, written by Cornell, and Return of the Living Dad, written by Orman. More recent Doctor Who and related work has been for Big Finish.

Orman has also had a number of short science fiction stories published.

In 2004, Orman and Blum's Doctor Who novella Fallen Gods, published by Telos the previous year, won the Aurealis Award for best Australian science-fiction book.

== Novels ==
=== Virgin New Adventures ===
- The Left-Handed Hummingbird (1993)
- Set Piece (1995)
- SLEEPY (1996)
- Return of the Living Dad (1996)
- The Room with No Doors (1997)
- So Vile a Sin (with Ben Aaronovitch, 1997)

=== "Benny" New Adventures ===
- Walking to Babylon (1998, later adapted into an audio drama by Big Finish)

=== Eighth Doctor Adventures ===
- Vampire Science (with Jonathan Blum, 1997)
- Seeing I (with Jonathan Blum, 1998)
- Unnatural History (with Jonathan Blum, 1999)
- The Year of Intelligent Tigers (2001)

=== Past Doctor Adventures ===
- Blue Box (2003)

=== Telos Doctor Who novellas ===
- Fallen Gods (with Jonathan Blum, 2003)

=== Big Finish Doctor Who Audionovels ===
- The Dead Star (2023)
- The Mirror Matter (2025)

== Novellas ==
- "All Mimsy Were the Borogoves" in Nobody's Children (Big Finish, 2007)

== Short stories ==
- "No-One Goes to Halfway There" (in Decalog 4, 1997)
- "The Bicycle Net" (in Interzone, September 1997)
- "The Adventures of Kate Orman, Novelist" (in Pretext: Salvage, 1999)
- "Steal from the World" in The Dead Men Diaries, 2000)
- "Cactus Land" (in Realms of Fantasy, August 2000)
- "Pyramid Scheme" (in Outside the Box: the Best Short Fiction from Bookface.com, 2001)
- "And All the Children of Chimaera" (in Passing Strange, 2002)
- "Ticket to Backwards" (in Agog! Fantastic Fiction, 2002)
- "Solar Max and the Seven-Handed Snake Mother" (in Bernice Summerfield: A Life of Surprises, 2002)
- "In the Days of the Red Animals" (in Agog! Terrific Tales, 2003)
- "The Peter Principle" (in Bernice Summerfield: Life During Wartime, 2003)
- "No Exit" (in Big Finish Short Trips: Steel Skies, 2003)
- "The Southwell Park Mermaid" (in Big Finish Short Trips: Life Science, 2004)
- "Buried Alive" (in Bernice Summerfield: A Life Worth Living, 2004)
- "Culture War" (in Big Finish Short Trips: 2040, 2004)
- "Nobody's Gift" (in Big Finish Short Trips: The History of Christmas, 2005)
- "White on White" (in Big Finish Short Trips: Christmas Around the World, 2009)
- "Black Sky Mining" (in In Uniform, Slash Books, October 2010)
- "Don't Do Something, Just Sit There" (in Bernice Summerfield: Present Danger, Big Finish, September 2010)
- "The Five-Dimensional Man" (Big Finish Short Trips, audio vol. 3, Big Finish, May 2011)
- "Crocodile City" (in Truth or Dare, Slash Books, July 2011)
- "Playing for Time" (in Liberating Earth, Obverse Books, 2015)
- "Saltier" (short story, Interzone Digital, 2023)
- "I Object" (short story, Interzone 302, June 2025)
- "Iron Star Swing" (short story, Analog, Jan/Feb 2026)

== Comics ==
- "Change of Mind" (in Doctor Who Magazine #221-223, 1995)

== Editor ==
- Liberating Earth (Obverse Books, 2015)
