= Adele Morales =

American writer (1925–2015)

Adele Carolyn Morales (June 12, 1925 – November 22, 2015) was an American painter, actress, and memoirist. Morales studied painting under Hans Hofman and was known for her abstract, expressionist paintings and her work in papier mâché. She also performed at the Actors Studio and was active in the New York art scene of the 1950s. While best known publicly for her marriage to Norman Mailer and the stabbing incident, Morales maintained an independent creative career throughout her life.

== Early life ==
Morales was born in New York City, to a family of Peruvian origin. She grew up in Bensonhurst but moved to Manhattan, where she studied painting with Hans Hofmann and took up a bohemian lifestyle, being involved for several years with Edwin Fancher (who, together with Norman Mailer and Dan Wolf, founded The Village Voice) and briefly with Jack Kerouac.

Mailer's biographer Mary Dearborn says of those days:

Adele thrived in the city. She frequented the Village bars, especially those, like the San Remo and the Cedar Tavern, favored by artists and writers, and she dressed in fantastic, gypsylike outfits. By all accounts, she had extraordinary physical presence. With striking dark good looks and a beautiful body, she seemed to exude sexuality. (It was widely known that her lingerie was ordered from Frederick's of Hollywood.)

== Life with Norman Mailer ==
In 1951 she moved in with Norman Mailer in an apartment upstairs from Wolf's, on First Avenue near Second Street in the East Village; they were married in 1954 and lived in a "loft on Monroe Street in the shadows of the Manhattan Bridge," which became a "popular salon" for the New York intelligentsia.

But after visiting Paris in the summer of 1956 Mailer and Morales decided to leave New York; Mailer wrote "the city was not alive for me. I was on edge. My wife was pregnant. It seemed abruptly too punishing to live at the pace we had been going for several years." In the fall of 1956 they moved to a rented "sprawling white saltbox farmhouse" in Bridgewater, Connecticut, near a literary and artistic community that included Arthur Miller and William Styron in nearby Roxbury.

In 1957, she gave birth to her first daughter, Danielle. Although Adele was happy at first in the country, there was "a constant low-level hostility between Norman and Adele, which got worse when they drank." They moved back to New York in the fall of 1958, renting an apartment at 73 Perry St. in the Village; Adele bore another daughter, Elizabeth Anne, in 1959. In the summer of 1960, in Provincetown, Massachusetts, Adele danced in a production called "The Pirates of Provincetown," and James Baldwin praised her performance, "though she had no lines beyond one scream, which she delivered with gusto in high 'method' style"; later that summer she had to bail Norman out of jail after a drunken run-in with the police.

=== Stabbing ===
On Sunday, November 20, 1960, Mailer stabbed Adele with a penknife after a party, nearly killing her. He cut through her breast, only just missing her heart. Then he stabbed her in the back. As she lay there, hemorrhaging, one man reached down to help her. Mailer snapped: "Get away from her. Let the bitch die." He was involuntarily committed to Bellevue Hospital for 17 days; his wife would not press charges, and he later pleaded guilty to a reduced charge of assault, and was given a suspended sentence. In the short term, Morales made a physical recovery, and the two divorced in 1962.

== Later life and legacy ==
In 1997, she published a memoir of her marriage to Mailer titled The Last Party, which recounted the violence and its aftermath. This incident has been a focal point for feminist critics of Mailer, who point to themes of sexual violence in his work.

She spent her last years in a rent-controlled Manhattan tenement in relative poverty. The former couple had two daughters: Danielle "Dandy" Mailer (born 1957) is a painter, and Elizabeth Anne "Betsy" Mailer (born 1959) is a writer. Morales died in New York City on November 22, 2015, from pneumonia, at the age of 90.

Shortly after her death, her daughter Danielle Mailer explained: "She wanted to be remembered as a gifted painter and actress and as a mother who was fiercely devoted to her (two) girls."
