= Vampire Science =

1997 novel by Jonathan Blum and Kate Orman

- Authors: Jonathan Blum; Kate Orman
- Series: Doctor Who book: Eighth Doctor Adventures
- Release number: 2
- Subject: Featuring: Eighth Doctor; Sam
- Set in: Period before The Bodysnatchers
- Publisher: BBC Books
- Publication date: July 1997
- ISBN: 0-563-40566-X
- Preceded by: The Eight Doctors
- Followed by: The Bodysnatchers

Vampire Science is the second novel in the BBC Books series, the Eighth Doctor Adventures, based upon the BBC's long-running science fiction television series, Doctor Who. It was written by Jonathan Blum and Kate Orman.

== Synopsis ==
An ancient Time Lord enemy, 'vampires', have been spotted on earth. Some of these creatures want to co-exist with humanity, but others want to cause destruction.

== Notes ==
The book was originally intended to feature the character of Grace Holloway from the 1996 Doctor Who television movie, but late in the day the authors were told that rights to the character were not available. The role was changed to that of Carolyn in the final novel.

The character of General Kramer previously appeared in a fan film that starred Jon Blum as The Doctor.

References are made to the Seventh Doctor and Ace.

Page 49 of the original print edition mistakenly calls the character Sam, Carolyn.
