= Mark Turpin (poet) =

American poet

Mark Turpin is an American poet.

== Life ==
Turpin is the son of a Presbyterian minister. He has spent 25 years working construction and building houses. He graduated from Boston University at age 47, with a master's degree.

He lives and works in Berkeley, California.

His work has appeared in The Paris Review, The Threepenny Review, Ploughshares, and Slate.

== Awards ==
- 1997 Whiting Award
- 2004 Ploughshares John C. Zacharis First Book Award for Hammer

== Works ==
- "Jobsite Wind", Slate
- "Waiting for Lumber", Slate, July 16, 2002
- "The Furrow", Tarpaulin Sky, Winter 2002
- "The Box"; "Pickwork"; "Shithouse"; "In Winter"; "Will Turpin b. 1987"; "Photograph From Antietam", Boston Review, 19.1
- "The Box", Online News Hour, September 2, 2002
- Hammer. Sarabande Books. 2003. ISBN 978-1-889330-86-0.
- Susan Aizenberg, Mark Turpin, Suzanne Qualls (1997). Take three 2. Graywolf Press. ISBN 978-1-55597-254-7.

=== Ploughshares ===
- "Before Groundbreak". Ploughshares. Winter 1992–1993. Archived from the original on November 4, 2007.
- "Photograph From Antietam". Ploughshares. Winter 1992–1993. Archived from the original on November 4, 2007.
