= Khmer sculpture =

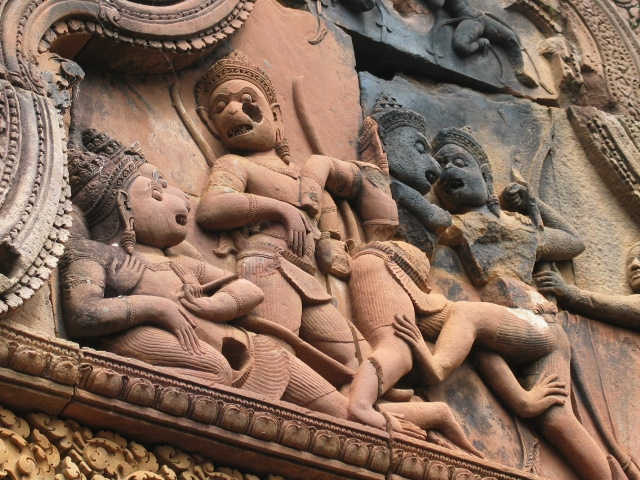
A scene from the Ramayana at Angkor.

Khmer sculpture (Khmer: ចម្លាក់ខ្មែរ, Châmleăk Khmêr [cɑmˈlak kʰmae]) is the stone sculpture of the Khmer Empire, which ruled a territory based on modern Cambodia, but rather larger, from the 9th to the 13th century. The most celebrated examples are found in Angkor, which served as the seat of the empire.

Most of the sculpture is religious, reflecting the mixture of Hinduism and Buddhism followed in the empire. Large resources were devoted by the state to the erection of grand and highly decorated religious complexes, which often also served to glorify the monarch.

There are several recognisable specific art styles of the Angkorian period:

1. Kulen style (c.825-875)
2. Koh Ker style (941–944)
3. Baphuon style (1010–1080)
4. Angkor Wat style (1100–1175)
5. Bayon style (late 12th to early 13th century)

== Movement away from Indian models ==
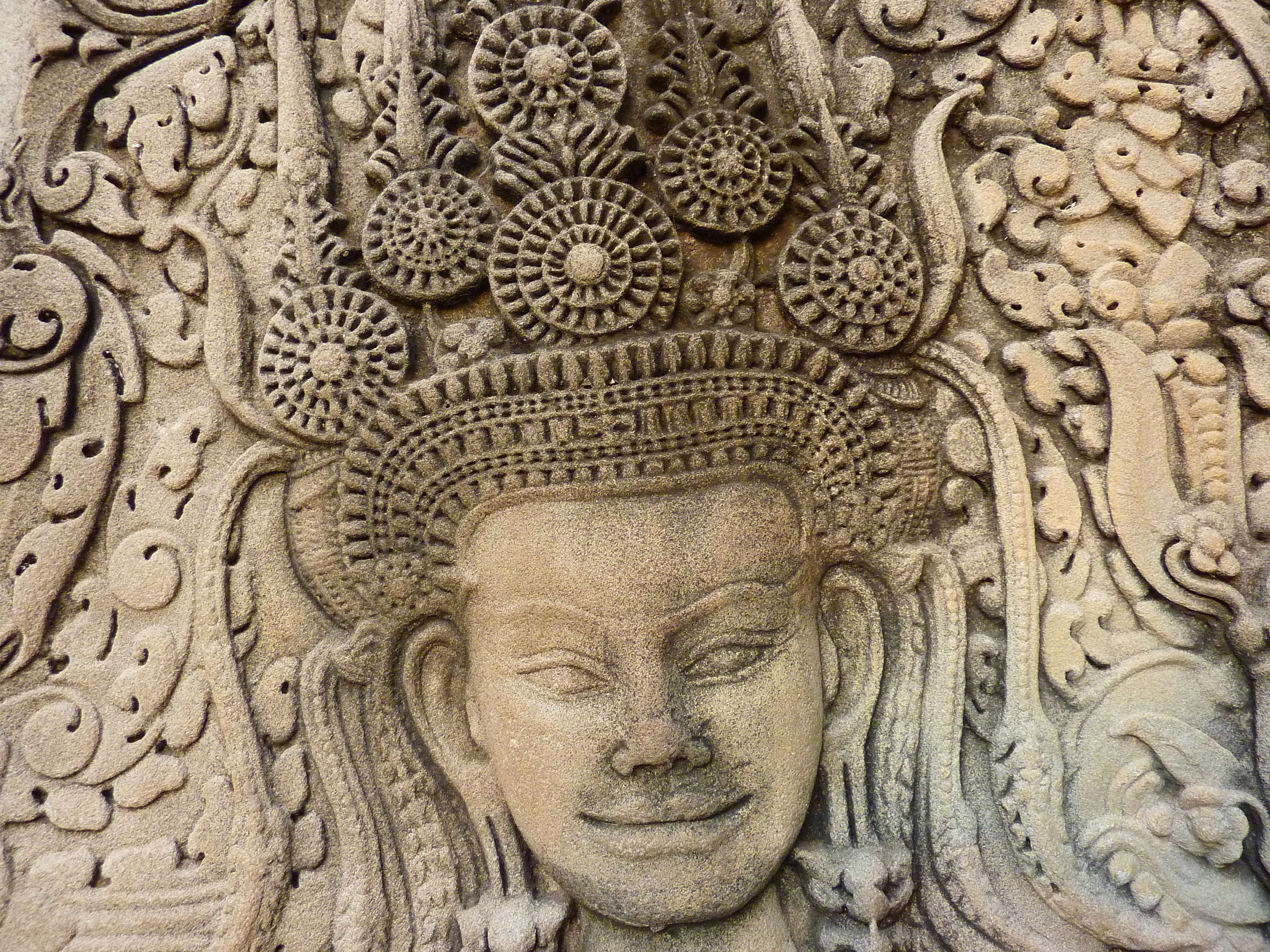
An Apsara carving at Angkor Wat.

Earlier Khmer art was heavily influenced by Indian treatments of Hindu subjects. By the 7th century, Khmer sculpture begins to drift away from its Hindu influences – pre-Gupta for the Buddhist figures, Pallava for the Hindu figures – and through constant stylistic evolution, it comes to develop its own originality, which by the 10th century can be considered complete and absolute. An example of Khmer style that totally departed from Indian sculpture tradition is the wholeness of its figure, which bears similarities to ancient Egyptian sculpture.

Unlike most Indian and Javanese Hindu-Buddhist stone sculptures, which were carved in high relief, or stelae supported by slabs at the figure's back, Khmer statues are carved wholly in the round. Khmer stone sculpture did not employ any stelae on the back of the figure to support it, as the result broken arms, hands or ankles vividly attest to the vulnerability of this format. Nevertheless, Khmer sculptors seem to wish their works to be seen from all sides in the garbagriha or sanctuary shrine in the center of the temple. Khmers attempted to make free-standing statues, supported by an arch or by an attribute of the divinity such as a piece of clothing or a hand-held object.

Khmer sculpture soon goes beyond religious representation, which becomes almost a pretext in order to portray court figures in the guise of gods and goddesses. But furthermore, it also comes to constitute a means and end in itself for the execution of stylistic refinement. The social context of the Khmer kingdom provides a second key to understanding this art. But we can also imagine that on a more exclusive level, small groups of intellectuals and artists were at work, competing among themselves in mastery and refinement as they pursued a hypothetical perfection of style.

The gods in Khmer sculpture are of shared pantheon of Buddhism and Hinduism. Priests supervised the execution of the works, including the iconographic precision of the sculptures. Nonetheless, unlike most Hindu images which repeat an idealized stereotype, Khmer images are treated with realism because they also depict living models: the king and his court. The true social function of Khmer art was, in fact, the glorification of the aristocracy through these images of the gods embodied in the princes. In fact, the cult of the “deva-raja” required the development of an eminently aristocratic art in which the people were supposed to see the tangible proof of the sovereign's divinity, while the aristocracy took pleasure in seeing itself – if, it's true, in idealized form – immortalized in the splendour of intricate adornments, elegant dresses and extravagant jewelry.

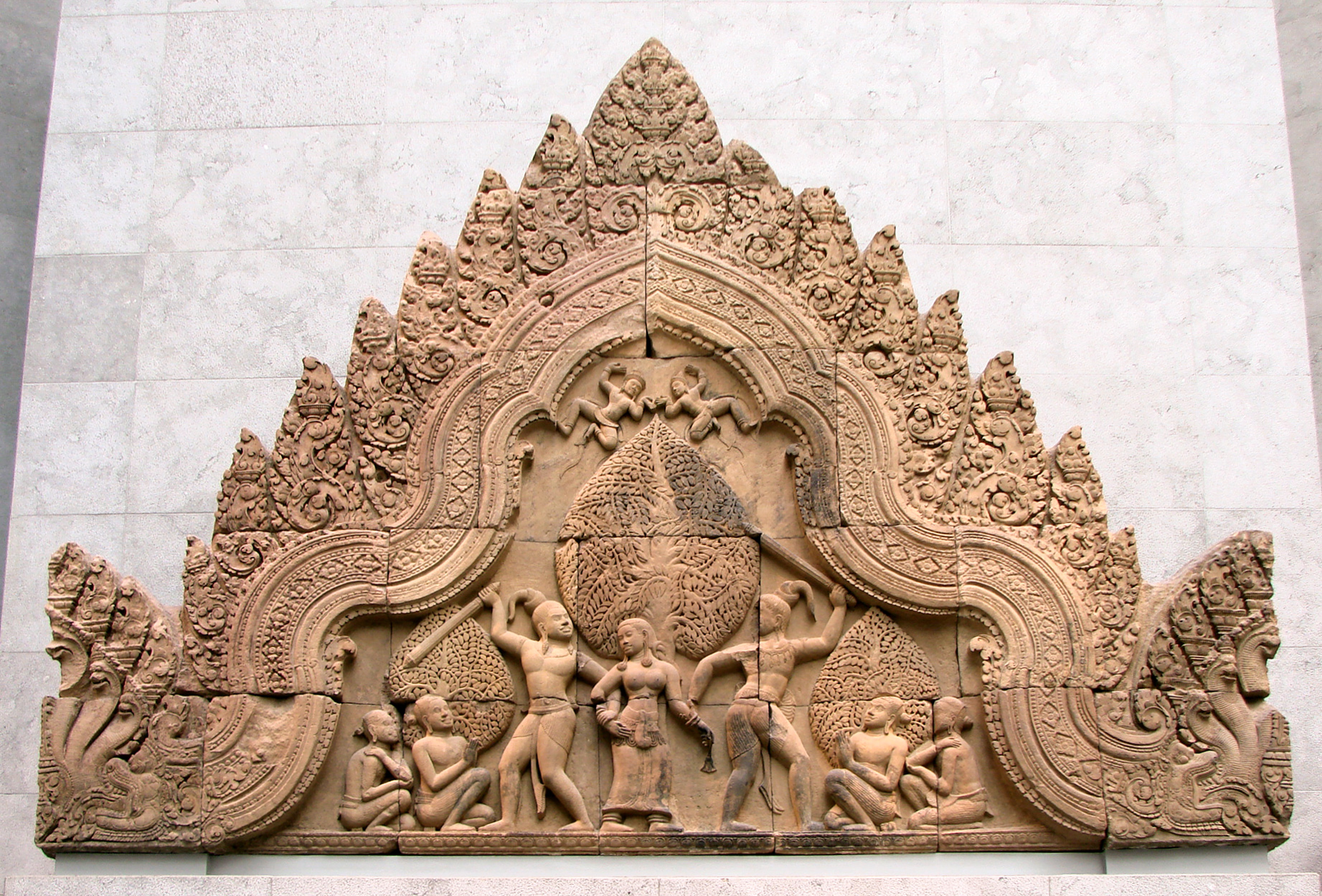
A relief from Angkor

The sculptures are images of gods, royal and imposing presences with feminine sensuality, giving impressions of figures at the courts with considerable power. The sculptures represent the chosen divinity in the orthodox manner and portray high figures of the courts in their attire, adornments and jewelry.

But if we go beyond this initial impression, we can pause to observe some of the details of the sculptures, such as the double arc drawn by the eyebrows on the foreheads, evoked below by the wisely sketched curve of the noses and further down, by the double arc which masterfully outlines the lips and the double chin. Following a hypothetical vertical line down still further, we find another double arc outlining the breasts, and then, continuing down from the waist all along the skirts and ending in the ankles, we find almost at the bottom, a twisted double arc intended to represent the other side of the skirts. This detail serves, above all, to eliminate a certain hieratic fixedness, which was relatively common in the Khmer statues of lesser quality.

== Archeological exploration ==
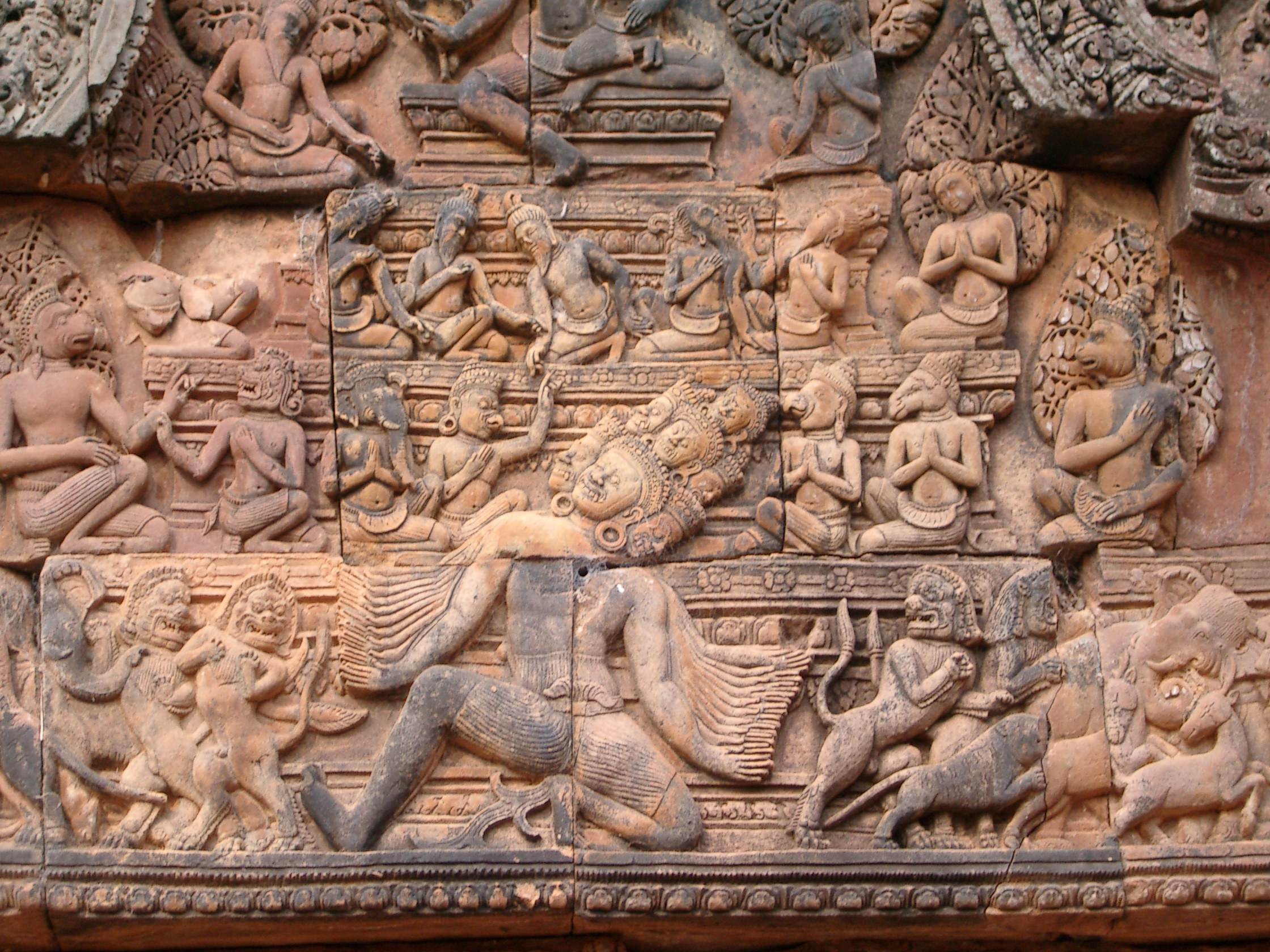
Elegant roof carvings at Banteay Srei.

Ever since 1864, when France established a Protectorate in Cambodia, Western travellers have been amazed by the impressive ruins of Angkor. Not long after, once the École française d'Extrême-Orient began to study and catalogue the findings made at the excavations, the growing number of scholars from all around the world, art lovers and admirers of this sculpture, became fervent proponents of Khmer Art.

“Khmer Art, captivating in its civility, refinement and delight, open to all forms of life, is made in the image of the country and its inhabitants. Nevertheless, among the arts of the Far East, few are as accessible to the Western temperament. Its profound beauty impresses itself upon the spirit and sensibility without requiring prior study. Its sobriety, its horror of excess and its sense of balance and harmony allow it to attain universal value.” Thus wrote Madeleine Giteau, the distinguished member of the École française d’Extrême-Orient, in the introduction to her book Les Khmers in 1965.

Currently, the largest museums of the West dedicate entire halls to Khmer sculpture, not to mention the enormous exhibition which took place first at the Galeries Nationales du Grand Palais in Paris and later at the National Gallery of Art in Washington in 1997.

== Gallery ==
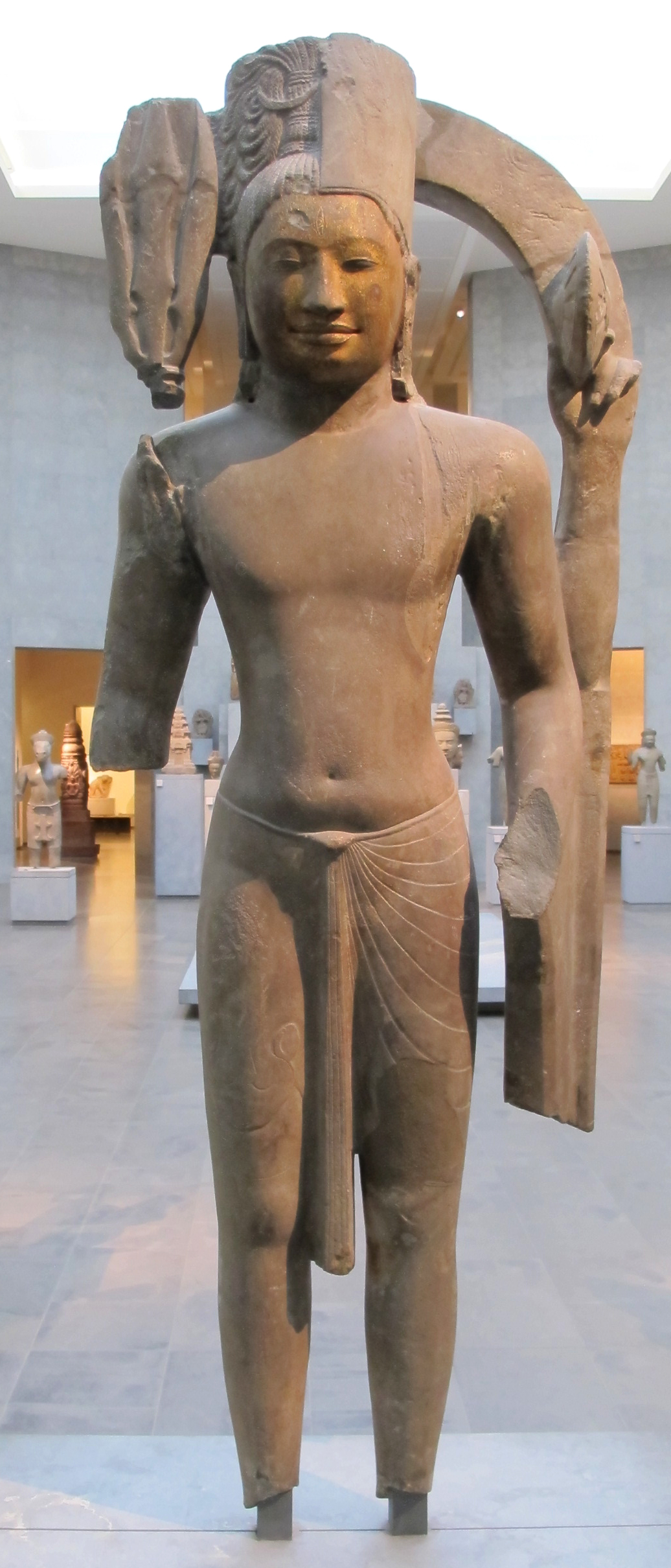
Harihara a composite of Vishnu at proper left and Shiva at right, was popular in the early Khmer period. 7th century

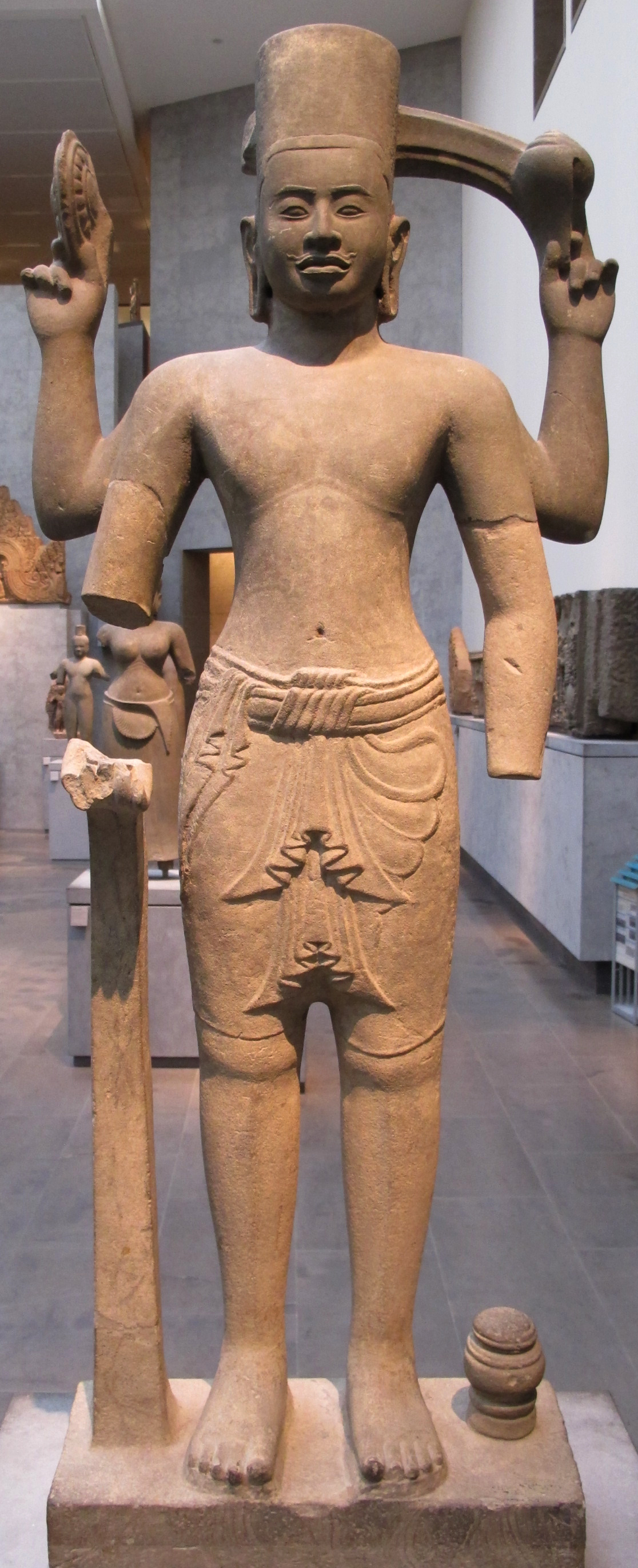
Vishnu in Kulen style, circa 9th century

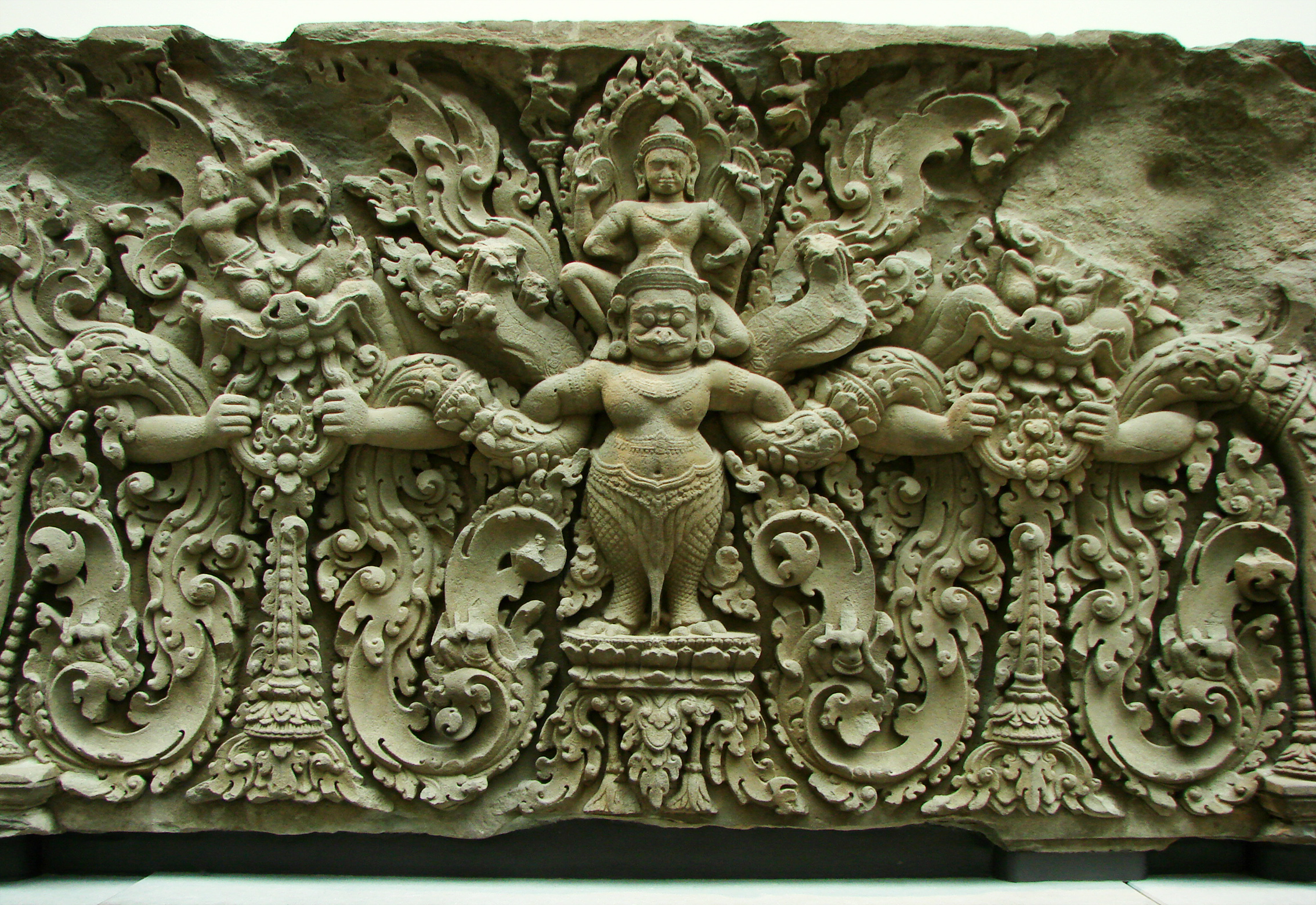
Lintel, Preah Ko style, late 9th century

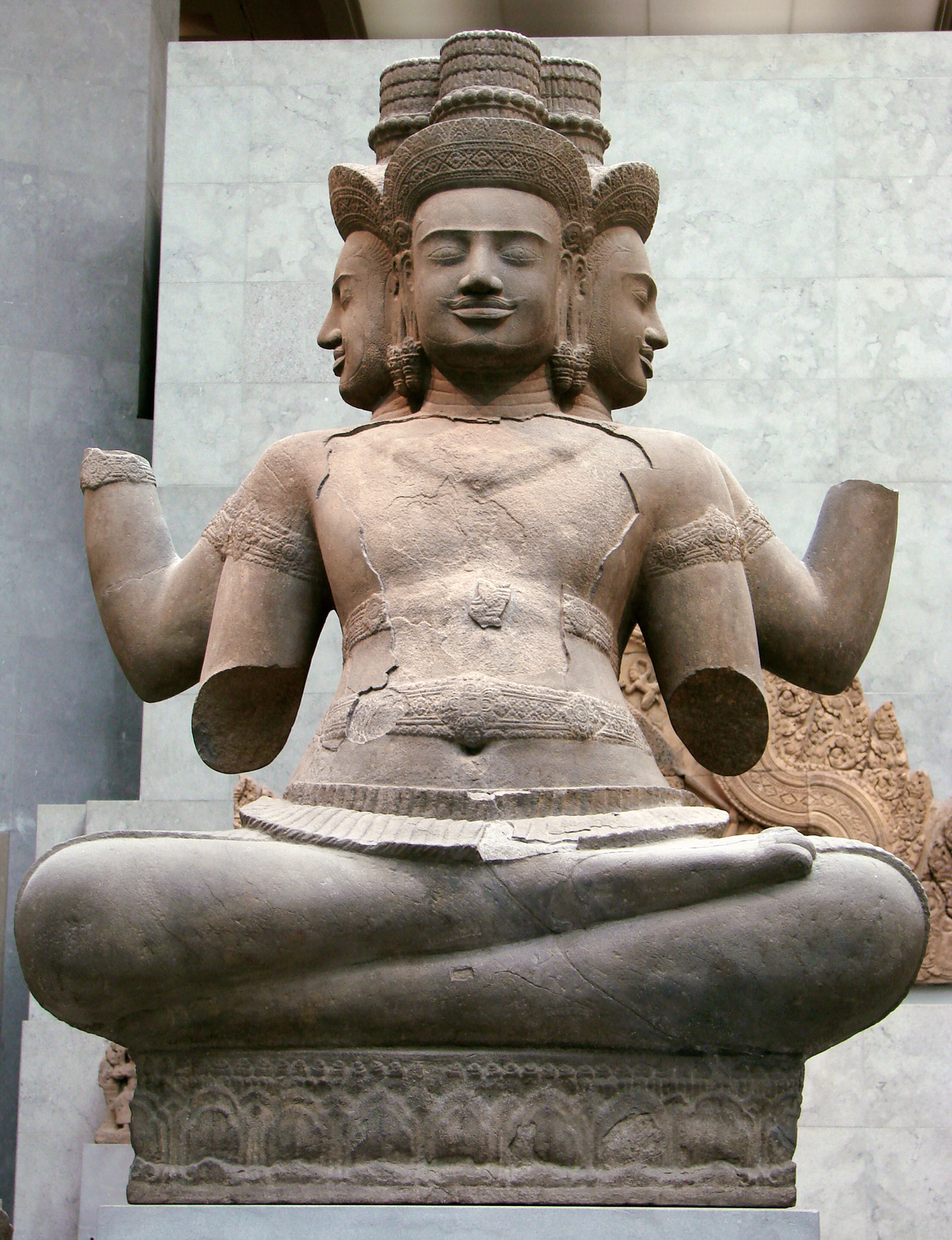
Brahma, circa 10th century

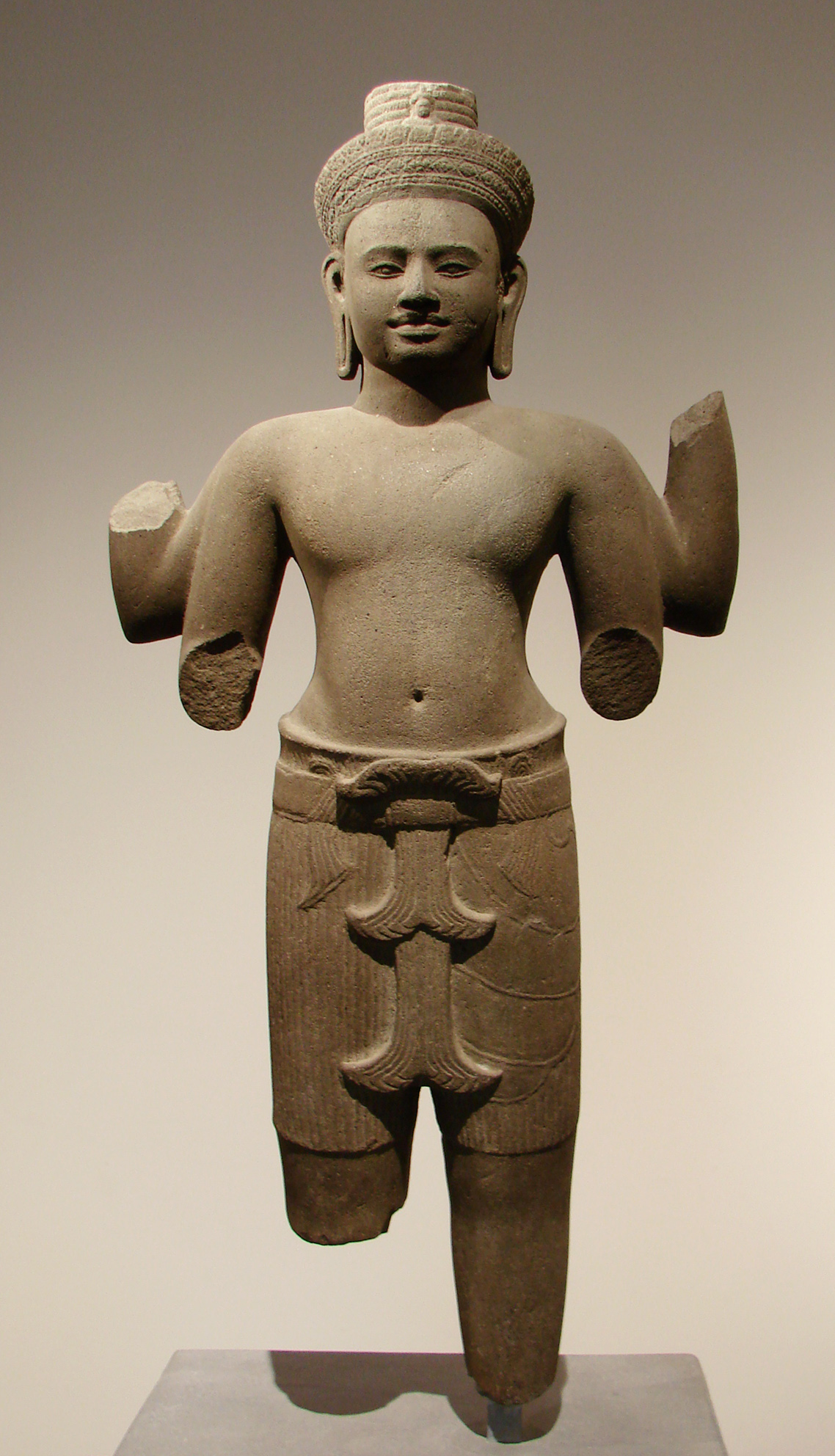
Boddhisattva Lokeshvara, circa end of 10th century to early 11th century

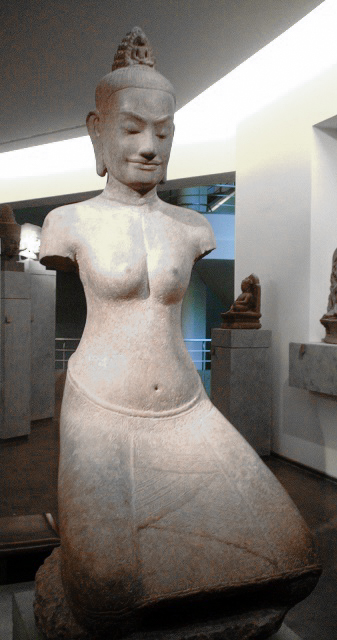
Jayarajadevi as Buddhist Tara, circa 12th century

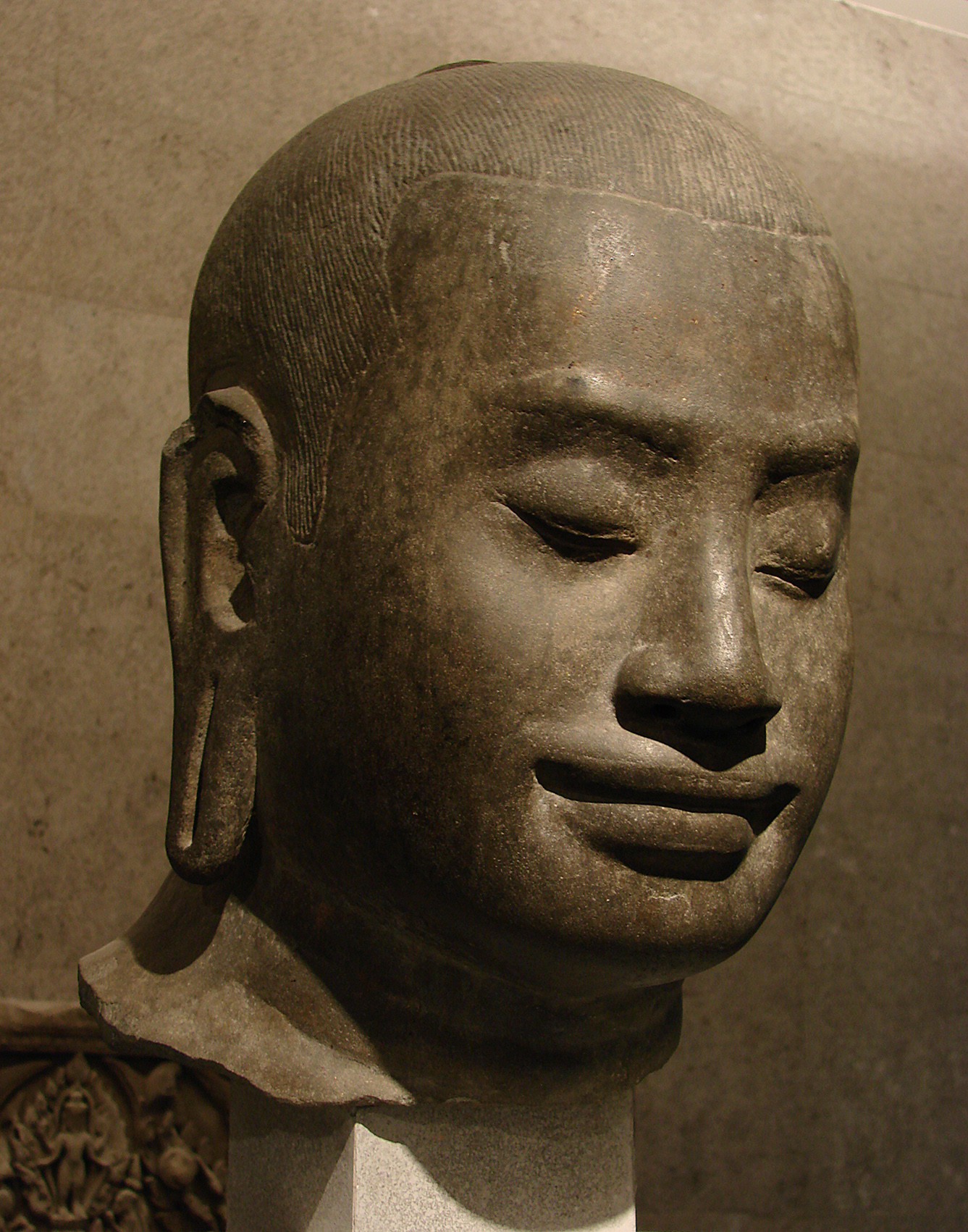
Portrait of Jayavarman VII meditating, Bayon style circa end of 12th century to early 13th century

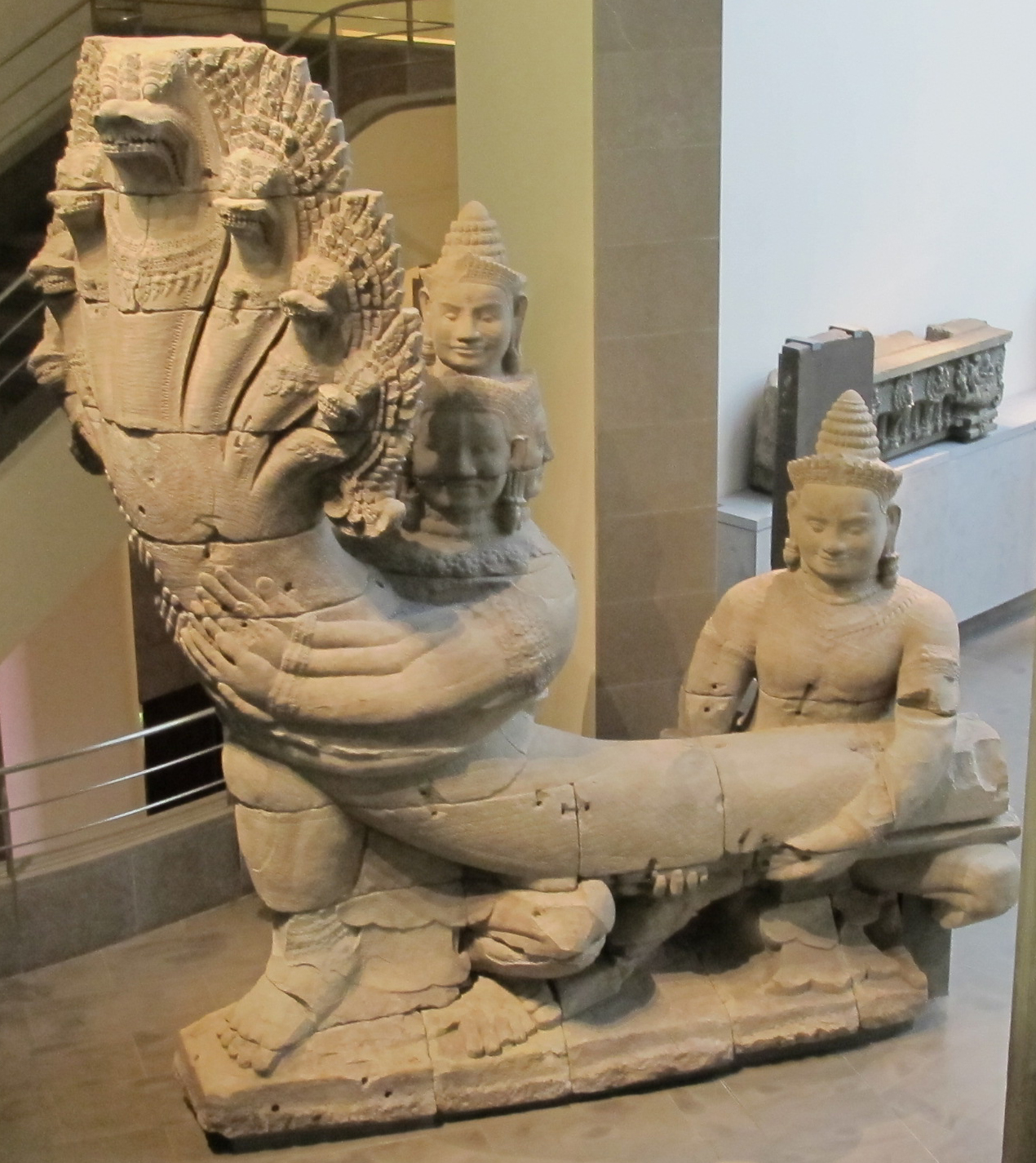
Devas pulling naga, Bayon style circa end of 12th century to early 13th century

== See also ==
- Architecture of Cambodia
- Culture of Cambodia
- Visual arts of Cambodia

General:

- Eastern art history

== Bibliography ==
- La espiritualidad del vacio, Khmer sculpture exhibition catalogue, Professor Matthias Barmann, Obrasocial Bancaja, Valencia, Spain.
- Lord Umagangapatisvara Annette L. Heitmann, Published: November 21, 2005. Asian Art.
- A Cambodian Masterpiece restored Jennifer Casler, September 2007. Apollo Magazine.
- Khmer Art Doctor Heiner Hachmeister, Hachmeister Galerie, Munich, Germany.
- Les Khmers, Sculptures Khmeres, reflets de la civilisation d'Angkor, Fribourg, Office du Livre. Madeleine Giteau, 1965.
