= Alexander Nikolov (poet) =

Bulgarian poet

- Born: Александър Николов; Varna, Bulgaria
- Writing career
- Literary movement: New Social Poetry (Нова социална поезия)

Alexander Nikolov (Bulgarian: Александър Николов; born on February 12, 1997, in Varna) is a Bulgarian poet, member of the Bulgarian avant-garde literary movement ″Nova sotsialna poezia″ (New social poetry).

He debuted in 2016 as laureate of the literary contest ″Petya Dubarova″, Burgas.

Since 2017 he publishes under the pen-name Александѫр Николов and has been the editor of the literary magazine “Nova sotsialna poezia”.

His first poetry book, fairness. (2018), was the first issue of the ″New Social Poetry Series″ for contemporary Bulgarian poetry. The English and French translations of its title poem ″Fairness″ appeared in New Social Poetry: The Anthology (2018) and Nouvelle poésie sociale: L'Anthologie (2018)
