= Countdown City =

Book by Ben H. Winters

- Cover of U.S. paperback original
- Author: Ben H. Winters
- Cover artist: Eric "Doogie" Horner
- Language: English
- Series: The Last Policeman #2
- Genre: Soft science fiction, police procedural
- Publisher: Quirk Books
- Publication date: July 16, 2013
- Publication place: United States
- Media type: paperback original, ebook
- Pages: 316 pp
- Awards: Philip K. Dick Award (2014)
- ISBN: 978-1594746260 (1st paperback)
- OCLC: 852163945
- Dewey Decimal: 813/.6
- LC Class: PS3623.I6735 C68 2013
- Preceded by: The Last Policeman
- Followed by: World of Trouble

Countdown City is a 2013 American soft science fiction mystery novel by Ben H. Winters. It is the sequel to The Last Policeman (2012) and follows the exploits of former detective Henry Palace as he investigates the disappearance of Brett Cavatone, the husband of his childhood nanny, Martha. The book is set in a world preparing for the impact of 2011GV1, an asteroid that will wipe out humanity, which will occur in 77 days, within the archipelago of Indonesia. As with The Last Policeman, Countdown City examines the psychological, cultural and metaphysical consequences of the apocalypse.

== Plot ==
With electricity and telecommunications links down, petroleum increasingly scarce and with water supplies of unknown potability, former Concord police detective Henry Palace is in a race with time. As the apocalypse approaches, individuals are abandoning their former professional and vocational responsibilities to pursue various personalized "bucket lists" of preferred activities, but despite his redundancy from the nationalized Concord Police Department, Palace still intends to fulfill his duty to Martha and Brett Cavatone. As the U.S. economy is dismantled, Concord is full of empty storefronts, while remaining police protect citizens from their feral apocalyptic fellow inhabitants.

Henry and Nico, his sister, travel to the former University of New Hampshire (which has now "seceded" from what used to be the United States), in search of Brett. One member of the UNH student "free republic" government, Julia Stone, is engaged in firearms transactions. Eventually, Palace finds Brett in a small community near Portsmouth Harbor and tries to persuade him to return to his wife. Remnant cutters from the U.S. Coast Guard, assisted by the U.S. Navy, are attempting to prevent refugees and illegal immigrants from the eastern hemisphere and the vicinity of the impact zone from entering into the contiguous United States, using deadly force, which disturbs Palace, who witnesses refugees at sea being killed by them. It also emerges that Martha was having an extramarital affair and that her estranged husband abandoned the relationship for that reason.

Brett Cavatone is shot and killed by a sniper, who shoots Palace as well, injuring him. Although Palace is injured, he is flown to Concord by an SH-60 helicopter, where Concord medical staff are still maintaining healthcare services. It turns out Jeremy, a coworker of Brett's, killed him because he wanted Martha for himself, even faking evidence of an affair. He later dies of an overdose. As for Martha, she and her father Rocky are enmeshed in a fraud promising miraculous escape from the impending cataclysm. It is presumed that they died in the riot that occurred in Concord after the water is shut off. However, Nico Palace is also pursuing a nostrum of her own- the use of nuclear deterrence against 2011GV1, which sets up the core scenario for the final book in the trilogy, World of Trouble (2014).

== Reception ==
Countdown City was the winner of the 2013 Philip K. Dick Award.

== Sequel ==
Countdown City is followed by World of Trouble, the final book in the Last Policeman trilogy.
