= World of Trouble =

2014 novel by Ben H. Winters

- Author: Ben H. Winters
- Language: English
- Published: July 15, 2014
- Publisher: Quirk Books
- Publication place: United States
- Media type: Paperback original, ebook
- Pages: 320
- ISBN: 9781594746857
- Preceded by: Countdown City

World of Trouble is an American soft science fiction mystery novel by Ben H. Winters and published by Quirk Books. It is the third and last installment of the Last Policeman trilogy. It was published on July 15, 2014.

== Plot ==
Only weeks and then days remain, as asteroid 2011GV1 is on the final stage of its deadly course towards Earth and it will impact within the Indonesian archipelago, which will obliterate humanity in an extinction event akin to that which wiped out the dinosaurs. Former Concord, New Hampshire police detective Henry Palace has found sanctuary in the woods of New England with a settlement of other former police officers. With only days left before the end of the world, Palace must solve one last case: finding his sister Nico. Nico is involved with a pseudo-survivalist cult. However, she is murdered in Ohio, and Palace needs to identify her killer and their motivation. En route, he encounters fragments of disintegrating U.S. society, such as armed gangs, intact communities, surviving families, former illegal immigrants, delusional survivalists or religious groups, and an Amish community to which he returns to spend the end of the world with after he finds and makes peace with Nico's killer. The novel and series end with Maia about to impact on the far side of the world as Palace and the Amish community sit down to begin a meal that will abruptly end with the unfolding tragedy on the other side of the world, all but Palace and two members of the Amish host family oblivious about their imminent fate. As 2011GV1 begins its entry into the Earth's atmosphere, seconds before impact, Palace ends his story and the series.

== Edgar Award nominee ==
World of Trouble was a finalist for Best Paperback Original in detective fiction's Edgar Awards 2015.
