= Date with Destiny Adventure =

The Date with Destiny Adventure series comprises two short novels of interactive fiction published by Quirk Books in 2003 that parodied the Choose Your Own Adventure series. Both books featured covers and interior designs similar to those of the old Choose Your Own Adventure books, but have adult themes. The first book, Night of a Thousand Boyfriends, is similar to the television show Sex and the City, and the second book, Escape from Fire Island, is set on Fire Island, part of which is a famous gay resort.

== Date with Destiny Adventures ==
- 1. Night of a Thousand Boyfriends by Miranda Clarke
- 2. Escape from Fire Island by James H. English

== See also ==
- Interactive fiction
