= The Unmothers =

2024 novel

- Author: Leslie J. Anderson
- Publisher: Quirk Books
- Publication date: August 6, 2024
- ISBN: 978-1-683-69429-8

The Unmothers is a 2024 novel written by Leslie J. Anderson. It follows recently widowed journalist Carolyn Marshall after her editor sends her to investigate a rumor in the small town of Raeford that a horse gave birth to a healthy human infant. It was published on August 6, 2024, through Quirk Books.

== Plot ==
Carolyn Marshall, a recently widowed journalist, is sent to the small town of Raeford on an assignment from her editor. She believes this to be because she has been spiraling since the death of her husband. Raeford is a very small community that revolves mostly around horses, but has recently been the topic of gossip after claims that a horse gave birth to a human baby, which Marshall is supposed to investigate. Marshall is met with suspicion or outright hostility by the locals, but the pregnant waitress at the diner Marshall stops at, Carter, agrees to give Marshall a ride to talk to the teenage father of the baby the next morning.

Marshall is kept up in her motel by a screeching animal inside the walls. In the morning, Marshall attends church with the town in order to talk to Roswell, the father of baby Phillip. Marshall speaks to Father Brown, who mentions an old superstition that he believes to be the root of the rumor. Marshall rents a truck from him. Service is interrupted by a local's horses getting loose, one of them injured. Marshall accompanies the townsfolk who go to look for the horses, where she sees one of the horses impaled on a fence post. One of the searchers calls out that they've found two bodies– human. One turns out to be alive, named Aaron, a local drug addict. The other is a deceased migrant worker.

Marshall realizes there's more to the town than just horses and rumors. As Marshall investigates, she hears more and more about a legend regarding horses and pregnancies. Marshall comes into conflict with John Daily, who runs not only the drug trade but essentially the entire town with his influence. He is the father of Agatha, who is the mother of Roswell and grandmother of Phillip. Roswell is being terrorized by a creature stalking the dark around his family's farmland. John Daily has set up Emma, Roswell's ex, with an apartment in the city, and is controlling her through manipulation and coercion, threatening to expose her secret.

Marshall talks to Emma, who reveals that she did part of a ritual she learned from older girls to pass her unwanted pregnancy to a horse, confirming that she is Phillip's mother. When the creature following Roswell becomes known to the entire town, the women of the town lead Emma to a large, mangled tree in the woods near the church. Father Brown cowers inside the church as the women lead Emma to the tree, where John Daily is tied up. The women explain that Emma did not finish the ritual, and she must make a sacrifice to stop the creature. The many victims of John Daily are brought up by the women, and Emma shoots John Daily.

The epilogue shows Emma living a calmer life in the city. It also shows the women of the town confronting another girl approaching the same tree to carry out the same ritual. Instead of ignoring it, this time the women approach the girl and offer to help her figure out what to do going forward. The creature is dormant, for now at least.

== Reception ==
=== Awards ===
Anderson received the Individual Excellence Award in fiction from the Ohio Arts Council in 2024.

=== Reviews ===
The Unmothers was included on the "Best Horror Fiction of 2024" list from The New York Times written by Gabino Iglesias. Anderson's novel also received positive reviews in Publishers Weekly and Library Journal.
