= Android Karenina =

2010 novel by Ben H. Winters

- Author: Ben H. Winters (with Leo Tolstoy attributed)
- Illustrator: Eugene Smith
- Language: English
- Genre: Parody, Steampunk
- Publisher: Quirk Books, Philadelphia
- Publication date: June 8, 2010
- Publication place: United States
- Media type: Print, (paperback)
- Pages: 538
- ISBN: 978-1-59474-460-0
- Preceded by: Sense and Sensibility and Sea Monsters
- Followed by: Pride and Prejudice and Zombies: Dawn of the Dreadfuls

Android Karenina is a 2010 parody novel written by Ben H. Winters based on the 1877 novel Anna Karenina by Leo Tolstoy. The novel is a mashup, adding steampunk elements to the Russian 19th-century environment of Anna Karenina, a book first published in 1877.

The book has the same main couples as Tolstoy's – Anna Karenina and Count Vronsky, and Kitty Shcherbatskaya and Konstantin Levin. Their society is high-tech, with servant-robots performing tasks all the way from pest control to education of children; the robots love their humans and are governed by the Iron Laws of Robot Behavior. Both Anna's husband and a terrorist group of scientists are opposed to widespread ownership of robots. The book also has time travel, space travel, aliens, and monsters. Eventually, the robots revolt against the humans, leading the latter to create ultra-human cyborgs to fight back.

Winters previously wrote Sense and Sensibility and Sea Monsters (2009) with Jane Austen, another parody novel.

== Reception ==
Jay Parini of The Guardian doubts that Tolstoy would have been amused by a parody of his book. For Elif Batuman of The New Yorker, the book is an unoriginal repetition of the original story. Ron Hogan of Den of Geeks acknowledged the clever reinterpretation of the original story, admitting that the steampunk/Tolstoy combination works, and calling the book a "definitive mash-up novel".
