= The Last Policeman =

2012 science fiction mystery novel by Ben H. Winters

- Cover of U.S. paperback original
- Author: Ben H. Winters
- Cover artist: Eric "Doogie" Horner
- Language: English
- Genre: Soft science fiction, police procedural
- Publisher: Quirk Books
- Publication date: July 10, 2012
- Publication place: United States
- Media type: paperback original, ebook
- Pages: 288
- ISBN: 9781594745768
- LC Class: 2011963358
- Followed by: Countdown City

The Last Policeman is a 2012 American science fiction mystery novel by Ben H. Winters. It follows a police detective in New Hampshire as he investigates a suicide he believes was really a murder. His efforts are complicated by the social, political and economic effects of preparations for, and anticipation of, an asteroid impact six months in the future.

Winters describes the work as an "existential detective novel", turning on the question of why people do things in spite of their long-term unimportance. He consulted with experts not only in astronomy and police techniques but psychology and economics. The book was well received by critics, and won the 2012 Edgar Award in the category Best Paperback Original. Producer Lorenzo di Bonaventura has optioned it for a possible television series. It is the first in a trilogy; Winters published Countdown City, the second volume, in mid-2013. World of Trouble, the final Last Policeman novel, was released in July 2014.

== Plot ==
The novel is divided into four parts—"Hanger Town", "Non-Negligible Probabilities", "Wishful Thinking", and "Soon, They Will"—each containing five chapters, and an epilogue. Each part has an introductory graphic giving the date, and the asteroid's right ascension, declination, elongation and delta, or distance from Earth, in astronomical units. The first part is dated March 20; the epilogue, April 11.

=== Background ===
In April 2011, astronomers discover a new asteroid, 2011GV_{1}. Analysis of its unusual orbit shows that it may come very close to Earth soon. By August, not only is that likely, the probability of an impact reaches five percent, triggering an economic panic that results in the bankruptcy of prominent corporations including McDonald's, 7-Eleven, Dunkin' Donuts, and Starbucks. Panera persists but their founders have undergone a cult-like religious rebirth and staffed them with people who share their beliefs.

As the asteroid, now popularly named Maia, approaches, its diameter is measured at 6.5 kilometers (4.0 mi), large enough to cause serious planetwide effects and the likely end of civilization should it strike the Earth. The probability of impact is regularly revised upward, peaking at 53 percent before Maia goes in conjunction with the sun and is unable to be seen for four months. In the face of increasing instability caused by the anticipation, governments enact strict emergency laws. The U.S. Congress passes the Impact Preparation Security and Stabilization Act (IPSSA), banning trade and production of firearms, imposing wage and price controls, and legalizing marijuana while toughening penalties for the possession or distribution of other drugs.

In January 2012 Maia emerges from conjunction with the sun and astronomers are able to determine whether the chances of Earth impact are 100 percent or zero. A tearful NASA astronomer announces to the largest television audience in history that Maia will indeed collide with the planet on October 3, 2012. It is determined that this will be impossible to prevent. Social and economic order begins to collapse as people leave their jobs to do things they will never have a chance to again (known in the book as "Bucket Listers"), and many take their own lives. Oil imports cease and the U.S. is limited to the Strategic Petroleum Reserve. After commercial supplies run out, only the police and military have fuel supplies, and civilians respond by converting their vehicles to run on biodiesel.

=== Synopsis ===
In late March 2012, Henry Palace, a young detective with the Concord, New Hampshire police, is called to a crime scene: a man named Peter Zell has apparently hanged himself in the men's room of a former McDonald's. The case seems clear-cut, but Palace wonders about the bruises on Zell's head and the fact that he was wearing a cheap suit but used an expensive belt to hang himself. Palace decides to consider the death a possible murder, and to investigate despite the limited resources available and peer pressure not to waste them.

His investigation finds several odd loose ends. Zell was an actuary who worked at an insurance company; the previous year he stopped showing up to work for several weeks before returning with no explanation, and his boss recalls an out-of-character angry incident at the office Halloween party. His secretary, Naomi Eddes, says she was not close to Zell, although Palace saw her in the parking lot outside the McDonald's. Zell's co-workers say he left that night with a man in a biodiesel-operated pickup truck. At Zell's apartment, Palace finds a stack of newspaper clippings about Maia, with extensive mathematical calculations in the margin, and the unexplained label "12.375". Zell had begun writing a note to his sister, Sophia Littlejohn, a midwife, but had stopped after addressing it. At Sophia's house, her husband Erik tells Palace that Zell was lately very depressed, but lies about his wife's whereabouts. The coroner refuses to do more than the absolute minimum when autopsying Zell's body, but Palace takes a vial of Zell's blood to the toxicology lab anyway.

Meanwhile, Palace must also deal with his sister Nico, who asks him to try to find her worthless husband Derek, who has gone missing. Eventually Palace learns that Derek was arrested for driving an ATV onto closed military property. He is able to visit Derek in detention, but Derek will not speak to him and Palace cannot secure his release.

Palace finds the driver of the pickup truck, a friend of Zell's named J.T. Toussaint, but his story that Zell left his house later that evening after the two saw a movie and drank some beers checks out. A patrol cop from the crime scene has been following the trail of Zell's cell phone, which was stolen from his body, and recovered it. Palace finds that Zell called Naomi Eddes every night, proof that she was lying to Palace earlier. When he confronts her, she explains that Zell was addicted to morphine and needed her help getting clean. Palace conjectures that the "12.375" on Zell's box is a percentage—that is, the threshold at which the chance of Maia destroying the Earth became high enough that it would be worth attempting a risky thing he'd always wanted to do: experimenting with drugs.

When a computer check finds that Toussaint is the son of a onetime major local drug dealer, Palace returns to question him. Toussaint admits to helping Zell use drugs but not to supplying them; Zell brought his own morphine sulfate to Toussaint's house, and Toussaint insists he doesn't know where it came from. When threatened with arrest, Toussaint tries to escape, injuring Palace's eye, and is then fatally shot by one of the other detectives. While his injury is being treated, Palace learns that midwives can write prescriptions, and realizes that Zell must have stolen his sister Sophia's prescription pad. He confirms this in a meeting with Sophia. She discovered the theft and got her prescription pad back from her brother in October, which accounts for Zell's strange behavior at that time: he was having withdrawal symptoms. Sophia admits that she hadn't told Palace about it because her husband wanted it kept quiet.

On behalf of his sister, Palace reaches out to Alison Koechner, a former high school girlfriend who now works with the Justice Department. Palace travels to Boston to see her, and from what she says Palace realizes that Derek believes in a conspiracy theory that claims the government is hiding information about the asteroid and some measures it has taken to ensure the survival of certain elites. Palace finds people's denial of the coming catastrophe more depressing than the catastrophe itself. Alison suggests that there was no good reason for Toussaint to attempt a risky escape unless there was something else in his house. Palace searches Toussaint's house and finds a large stash of drugs, guns, and cash hidden in the doghouse; while he is there he hears someone else flee the scene.

Naomi Eddes calls Palace with an idea: with no actuarial work left to do, Zell, like everyone else at his company, was investigating life insurance claims. Someone who had collected on a false insurance claim would have a motive for murder (in order to avoid spending all the time left before the world ends in prison). Palace and Eddes have dinner and she spends the night at his apartment, then leaves early in the morning. The toxicology screen on Zell's blood comes back and finally proves that Palace was right to suspect murder: prior to his death, he had been drugged with GHB. Nico calls and quickly tells her brother she will be leaving for a long time but that she will see him again, then hangs up. Palace drives to the military base where Derek was detained, but the soldiers deny that Derek was ever there. Just after that, Palace learns that Naomi has been found in her office, shot dead, apparently while searching for a file she promised to get him.

Palace calls Naomi's father to deliver the news, but as soon as he identifies himself as a police officer, the father hangs up. From the father's behavior Palace guesses that Naomi has a history of trouble with the law, and he has a toxicology screen run on her blood: it reveals morphine sulfate. Naomi was an addict herself, which is why Zell came to her for help with his own withdrawal. From this Palace puts it together: Naomi had started using drugs again when the news about the asteroid was confirmed; she got her drugs from Toussaint, having learned about him from Zell. The insurance-fraud suggestion was a red herring. Zell and Eddes were both killed by Toussaint's supplier: Sophia's husband, Erik Littlejohn, who has been stealing the pain medications from the hospital where his wife works. Palace arrests Littlejohn and takes him to the station house, where the detectives are told that the department has been federalized and is being shut down.

In the epilogue, Palace, who has now been granted early retirement, bicycles to the New Hampshire shore. Since the case was closed it has been announced that Maia will hit Indonesia, far away from the U.S. With the chances of post-impact survival a little higher, at least in the short term, the public mood is less gloomy. At the beach, he tidies up one loose end from the case, then returns home, where he finds his sister waiting for him. She confesses that she used both Palace and Derek to help a group she was part of determine whether the military facility her husband was held in was in fact the one where they believe the government is working on its plans for a lunar habitat, and then leaves.

== Characters ==
=== Concord police ===
- Det. Hank Palace, the protagonist of the novel. He decided to become a police officer in his pre-teens, after his mother, a long time civilian employee of the Concord police, was killed in a robbery and his grief-stricken father, a professor of English Literature at St. Anselm College, hanged himself. After 16 months as a patrolman, during which the build up to Maia began having social and economic effects, he was promoted to detective.
- Ritchie Michelson, a uniformed officer recently hired under streamlined training procedures. He enjoys goading Palace, whom he calls "Stretch."
- Trish McDonnell, one of the few uniformed officers Palace still has respect for. She is a friend and helps him solve the Zell murder.
- Det. Culverson, one of the remaining detectives and the only African-American left on the force thus his nickname "the only black man in Concord." In his earlier years he became friends with Palace when Culverson investigated Palace's mother's murder.
- Det. McGully, a jokester who does not take Palace's theories seriously. He has begun to dress very casually at work and sometimes smokes marijuana to dull his anxieties, especially after he kills J.T. Toussaint.
- Det. Andreas, an older detective who commits suicide after the Toussaint shooting.
- Denny Dotseth, an assistant state attorney general, whose responsibility it would be to prosecute the murder.

=== Other investigators ===
- Dr. Alice Fenton, the forensic pathologist at Concord Hospital who autopsies Zell's body. At first she is irritated with Palace for forcing her to miss one of her daughter's remaining piano recitals, but then when she finds proof that Zell was murdered in the blood toxicology report she goes as far as to help Palace arrest the murderer.
- Alison Koechner, high-school girlfriend of Palace's who now works in an unspecified federal law enforcement capacity "several orders of magnitude" above him.

=== Civilians ===
- Nico Palace, Hank's sister. Hastily married on the day after the impact date was announced, she was adversely affected by her parents' death and has had a troubled life since then. Hank has often had to help her out of her difficulties.
- Derek, Nico's husband. He is arrested for trespassing onto a New Hampshire National Guard post and then, after Palace visits him in jail, disappears. He is presumed dead.
- Naomi Eddes. A co-worker of Zell, she has shaved her head bald to avoid having to take care of her hair in the remaining months. She had resumed a long time drug habit when the asteroid impact date was announced. She has a brief fling with Palace. Late in the novel she is found shot to death in her office.
- Theodore Gompers, manager of the insurance company's regional office.
- Sophia Littlejohn, Zell's sister, a midwife.
- Erik Littlejohn, Sophia's husband, Concord Hospital's director of spiritual services.
- J.T. Toussaint, a local man who turned to odd jobs and then, at Zell's prompt, dealing drugs like his father when he was laid off from the local quarry. He is shot dead during a police confrontation.
- Victor France, a local drug dealer Palace uses as an informant.

== Themes ==
Winters describes The Last Policeman as an "existential detective novel." In a Wired interview with Ethan Gilsdorf, he responded to a question about why he had written it with "Why does anybody do anything? (Hey, what do you know? That's the theme of the book!)" Publicity material for the book put the question in more specific terms: "What's the point in solving murders if we're all going to die?" In a prepublication interview with a British website, Winters elaborated on the book's themes: "Moral behavior. The inevitability of death, and what to do about it. How true character is revealed through adverse circumstances."

Naomi Kanakia, reviewing the novel for Strange Horizons, says the novel's major theme changes as the reader learns midway through the book that there is a chance at least some people will survive the immediate impact and perhaps live long enough through the aftermath to begin repropagating humanity and rebuilding civilization. "Suddenly, we're dealing with a familiar disaster theme: the story of mankind's indomitable will to survive," she writes. "[Palace']s struggle is not absurd; it is purposeful. In holding civilization together, he is increasing the chance that something will survive the catastrophe."

== History ==
For a long time, Winters had wanted to take on the challenge of writing a detective story. "The great books of that genre have some levels to them, some resonances beyond the X to Y to Z of clue tracking," he told Gilsdorf. To give his story that depth, "it occurred to me to give my hero the challenge of solving his case in the midst of some earth-shaking calamity, and from there it was a short trip to the end of the world."

He undertook extensive research to make the pending impact event scenario realistic. Since he and his family were living in Cambridge, Massachusetts, at the time, it was easy for him to get in touch with asteroid expert Timothy Spahr, director of the Minor Planet Center at the Harvard–Smithsonian Center for Astrophysics. When Winters outlined his scenario, the astrophysicist responded "Oh, sure. I can get you your asteroid."

He further consulted with experts in police procedure and forensics, as well as economists and psychologists, to create a realistic model of a "world on the brink." However, one expert he spoke with was not enthusiastic about the proposed novel. Former NASA astronaut Rusty Schweickart, now chair emeritus of the B612 Foundation, which raises awareness of the threat posed by asteroid impacts and plans ways to prevent them, urged Winters to consider instead building his novel around what Schweickart said was the more likely scenario of a sub-apocalyptic impact. However, "I needed my detective, and the world around him, to be dealing with the impending death of all and everything." Winters apologized to Schweickart in the acknowledgements at the end of the book and urged readers to visit B612's website.

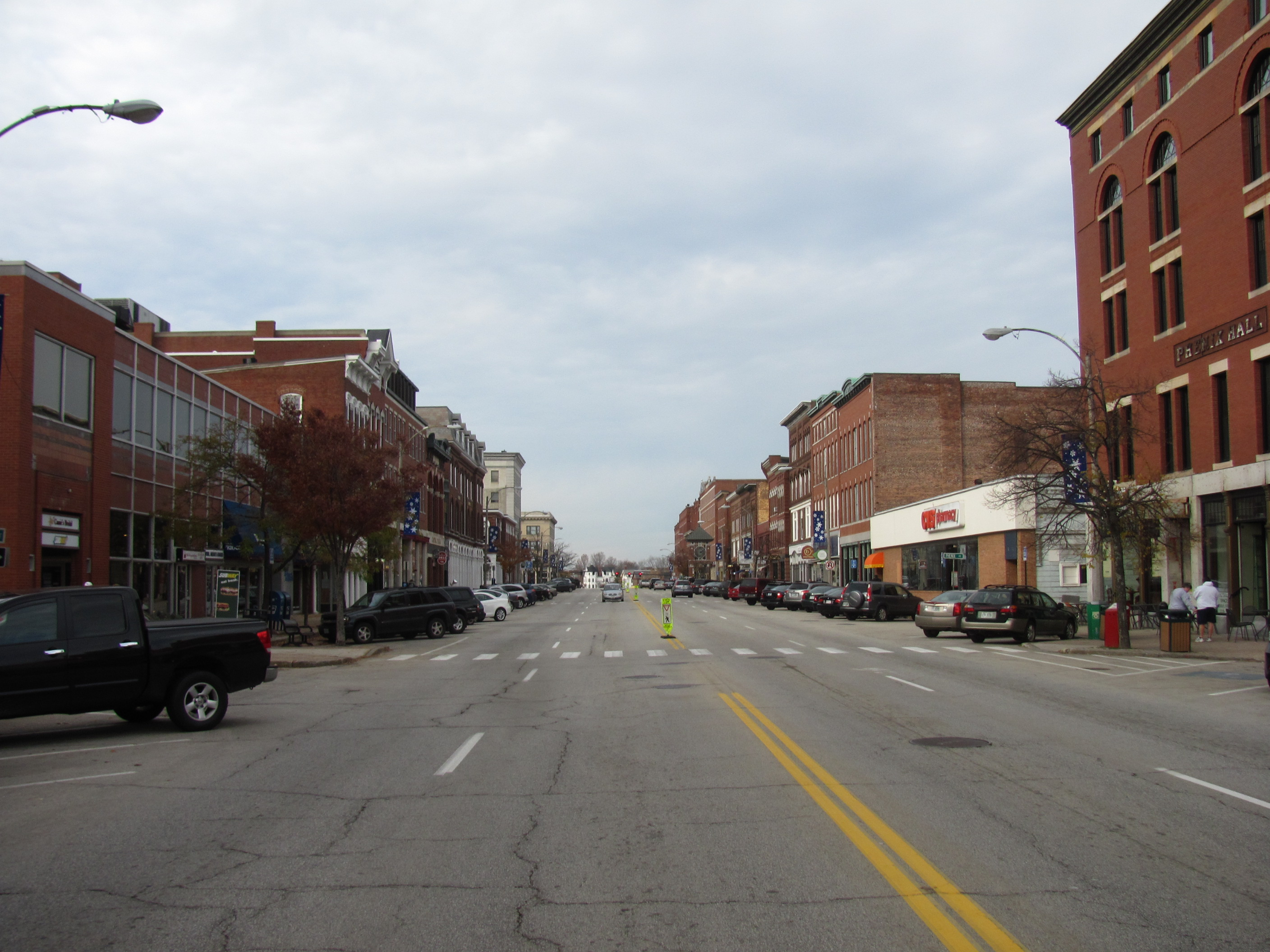
Downtown Concord in November 2011.

Originally, Winters was going to set the story in Brooklyn, which he knew well. "[B]ut something about a New York City crime novel seemed wrong for this idea." He decided instead that his hero would be a cop in a smaller city, but still one large enough that the social dimensions of an impending apocalypse would be apparent. His brother had lived in nearby New Hampshire for years, and he found his city there. "Concord's population is well under 100,000, but it still houses the state government, it still has a decent-sized downtown, it still has a spread of neighborhoods and industries and economic classes. Just felt perfect."

Having chosen his setting, it was important to Winters that he be able to describe it realistically. "It was important to me that this not be a Concord of my imagination, first of all because I love road-map novels, books where you feel like you could read it and know your way around the world where it's set." So he drove to Concord from Cambridge many times to get a feel for the city. "I think I got things mostly right, although I do mention a dive bar called The Green Martini, which has apparently burned down."

Early drafts of the novel were in the third person, in the past tense. But Winters soon realized this was not working, given the underlying premise of the story. "What I realized is that when you’re writing a series that builds up to most of mankind being destroyed, the whole convention, the literariness of the past tense becomes really glaring. I kept wondering, who is telling this story? And when?" So he changed to the first person and the present tense, which also increased the suspense since the reader only knows what Hank knows. That change, and Winters' request for more time to complete the book, coincided with the birth of his daughter, a break which helped him understand the character better.

=== Promotion ===
To accompany the book's release, publisher Quirk Books included two unusual promotional techniques on its website. One was a video trailer for the book, with a variety of speakers focusing on the question of what they would do in such a situation. Elsewhere on the site, various other writers, including Gilsdorf and Steve Hockensmith, provided their responses to the same question.

=== Possible television series ===
Shortly after the book's publication, Deadline Hollywood reported that Lorenzo di Bonaventura, producer of the Transformers movies, had optioned The Last Policeman for development as a TV series. An editor at Quirk was tapped to serve as a producer of the series. Winters said this posed an interesting challenge for any writer since a television series would necessarily have a limited timeframe for episodes to take place.

Around the same time, My Book, The Movie, a blog at which authors are asked to say whom they would imagine playing characters in their works, asked Winters whom he saw playing the parts in The Last Policeman. While Winters didn't imagine a sensible movie producer trying to waste a lot of time finding a tall, gangly young actor to play Hank, in his mind he saw Jim True-Frost in the part, based on his performance as Prez in The Wire. "[H]e plays like I imagine Palace—thin, wiry, hunched, interesting[-]looking, inward, unconventionally handsome."

Winters imagined another actor from The Wire, Wendell Pierce, as Culverson and Rose Byrne as Nico. "She's got this kind of angular toughness that emerges in Nico towards the end of the novel." As stunt casting, he envisioned Tom Waits playing the police chief, who has only two short scenes in the book, "[b]ut only because I'd really, really like to meet [him]."

A pilot was optioned by NBC in September 2016. The pilot is to be produced by Neal Moritz and written by Winters.

In July 2021, it was announced Fox had given a pilot order to The Last Police based on the novel and considered for the 2021–22 television season, with Kyle Killen to make the pilot. In January 2022, Fox passed the project.

== Reception ==
Most reviews of The Last Policeman were favorable. Many focused as much on the story's setting rather than the mystery. "What's more interesting than the mystery surrounding Zell's death is Winters' vision of a pre-apocalyptic world, one where laws are both absolute and irrelevant and even minor players have major control over what could be a new future," wrote Kirkus Reviews. At Slate, Dan Kois was effusive. "Winters' plotting is sure-footed and surprising," he wrote. "[He] reveals himself as a novelist with an eye for the well-drawn detail."

At Strange Horizons, months after publication, Kanakia took a more measured view, calling it "more of a premise than a novel" but admitting she was intrigued enough by that. The background scenario was an "inspired juxtaposition" against stock crime-novel characters. But, she regretted, it makes use of that "just barely enough." While she said Winters' exploration of how people might continue on with the things they've always been doing in the face of imminent doom "adds a few hills to the psychogeography of the planet-busting asteroid trope," the rest of the book undercut its themes, especially as it starts to become apparent that Maia's impact may not be the end, after all. Nonetheless, the story was still "a fun and competent police procedural story. The working-out of the murder offers enough twists to make the book an enjoyable experience." She particularly praised the novelist for setting the story in a smaller city.

It's not terribly common, in fiction, to be treated to a story set in one of America's small cities. Its Bellinghams and Green Bays and Wilmingtons don't seem to get much love from writers. I enjoyed the expansive claustrophobia of Winters's Concord. It's a place that has the architecture and anonymity of a city, but a smallness that allows for interesting juxtapositions ... One really gets the sense that this tiny group of people is responsible for the continued functioning of this city: there is no off-stage machinery that will take up the slack if they fail.

The Concord Monitor's reviewer liked the book and verified that Winters had "done his homework" in his depiction of the city.

=== Awards and recognition ===
The Last Policeman won the 2013 Edgar Award from the Mystery Writers of America in the category Best Paperback Original.

== Sequels ==
The Last Policeman is the first book in a trilogy. Some reviewers, aware of this, appropriately noted that the Nico plotline is unresolved at the end of the novel, and her last appearance shows there might be more to her character than the story had previously suggested. Winters published the second volume, Countdown City, in July 2013.

Originally titled Incoming, it was later changed to Disasterland. However, in February 2013 Quirk found that title had already been used, and they, Winters and his editor settled on Countdown City. "[W]e ... all decided we liked [it] better anyway."

Countdown City is set in June, midway between the events of the first book and Maia's impact. Hank, unemployed since the Concord police were federalized at the end of The Last Policeman, is asked by his former babysitter to search for her husband, who has abandoned her. The case appears impossible given the large numbers of people abandoning their lives as the asteroid looms, but Hank is dogged in his attempts to track the man down. It is set along the East Coast, where the breakdown of society has continued, and armed vigilante groups attempt to prevent immigrants fleeing the Indonesian impact zone from coming ashore. The same themes will be explored further.

Winters announced on his blog on January 10, 2014 that the title of the third book in the series would be called World of Trouble. He did not initially announce an expected date for publication, although it was later disclosed as July 2014. " Winters said that World of Trouble would have plot and thematic content in common with the two earlier books in the trilogy. As the apocalypse nears, US society has almost completely disintegrated, apart from a few orderly intact and self-sufficient rural communities. "[It] will have at its center a crime that Palace is trying to solve," he said. "But, also like this one, each will be at least equally interested in the details of the disintegrating world, and in plumbing the psyche of this lawman."
