= Shatter Me =

Young adult dystopian thriller novel by Tahereh Mafi

- Author: Tahereh Mafi
- Language: English
- Series: Shatter Me series
- Genre: Romance; Young adult dystopian
- Publisher: HarperCollins Publishers
- Publication date: November 15, 2011
- Publication place: United States
- Media type: Print (hardcover)
- Pages: 338
- ISBN: 978-0-06-208548-1
- Followed by: Unravel Me

Shatter Me is a young adult fiction dystopian romantic thriller written by Tahereh Mafi, published on November 15, 2011. The book is narrated by Juliette, a 17-year-old girl who can kill people with her touch. The book is published in a semi-epistolary style, in the format of diaries and other documents. Shatter Me is the first of a series of seven books along with five novellas.

Mafi has stated she drew inspiration from "an interest in human nature and [humanity's] ability to overcome great obstacles".

== Plot ==
Juliette Ferrars is a 17-year-old girl whose touch is lethal. Anyone who comes into contact with her skin for long enough will die. Juliette is kept in an asylum 264 days prior to the start of the book after accidentally killing a small boy with her touch when she was 14. At the start of the book, there are many intentional strike-throughs and the writing is often erratic in order to serve as a visual representation of the chaos in Juliette's mind.

To her surprise, Juliette gets a cellmate who goes by the name of Adam Kent. He reminds Juliette of somebody distant she used to know; however, she convinces herself otherwise. At first, Adam and Juliette remain distant from each other, but become closer over the week as Juliette shows him the ways of the asylum.

One day, The Reestablishment, a government that has the world within its grasp, comes for Juliette. It is revealed that Adam is a soldier for Warner, the chief commander of Sector 45 of The Reestablishment. Warner, who is also the son of The Reestablishment's Supreme Commander, makes Juliette an offer that includes her being able to get out of the asylum in turn for her torturing any prisoners with her touch as a weapon for The Reestablishment.

Warner wants to feel the full effects of Juliette's power, but she refuses to touch or hurt him, so he forces her to torture a soldier named Jenkins. Warner also makes her torture a small child, which is revealed in a later sequel to have been a simulation.

During her captivity, Juliette develops a romantic relationship with Adam. It is revealed that Adam knew Juliette prior to the asylum, and is in love with her. Adam eventually helps Juliette escape from Warner, and as they escape, Warner's hand unintentionally brushes against Juliette's ankle, revealing that Warner can also touch Juliette without consequences.

Adam and Juliette run away to where Adam's 10-year-old brother James lives, a small apartment Adam helped to make. James is taken care of by his neighbors because Adam had to live with the other soldiers; to the brother's knowledge, both of their parents are dead. Through spending time together, Adam starts to become possessive of Juliette. One of Adam's fellow soldiers, Kenji Kishimoto, shows up claiming that Warner had him tortured in order to learn Adam and Juliette's whereabouts. Kenji says that he knows a safe place where they can escape, and they formulate a plan. Juliette and Adam split up with Kenji and James, but Adam and Juliette are captured and Warner shoots Adam.

Warner drags Juliette into an abandoned classroom and tells her he loves her. Warner kisses Juliette, so she seduces him to get the gun from his jacket. She shoots him, the bullet missing anything vital. She finds Adam in a slaughterhouse, and they escape, although Adam's leg is badly injured. They meet up with Kenji and James, to whom Kenji has given sedatives so that he will not be traumatized by the condition Adam is in.

It is revealed that Kenji is a member of the Rebellion against the Reestablishment, called Omega Point. Adam, Juliette, and James are recruited by the Rebellion and then join it.

== Reception ==
Reviews for Shatter Me have been mixed, with many reviewers stating criticisms while overall recommending the work.

A youth reviewer for the National Post recommended it highly, stating that it had "just the right amount of action to make it thrilling, but not exactly gruesome." It was included in BuzzFeed's list of best YA books of all time.Kirkus Reviews praised Shatter Me for its love story, but stated that the ending "falls flat" and that there was an "over reliance on metaphor". The Guardian reviewed the book very positively, giving it a '4.5 stars out of 5'

Booklist gave a mixed review, noting that there were "plot conveniences and melodramatic writing to spare" while praising it for its "rip-roaring adventure and steamy romance scenes".Publishers Weekly cited that while the book "doesn’t escape some rookie pitfalls," Tahereh Mafi "combines a psychological opener with an action-adventure denouement in her YA debut," ultimately calling it "a gripping read from an author who’s not afraid to take risks".

Jane Campbell, in the journal 'Reading Time' writes that Mafi's age at the time of writing, which was 24, helps to 'explain some of her writing techniques.' However, Campbell praises her, writing thats she gives Mafi 'full credit to her for being a published writer who has created a potentially gripping story about a futuristic world.' Campbell's review is reflective of a lot of other reviews, writing that it is 'an interesting story that cleverly built up curiosity' but countering it with criticism, writing that one 'problem with the story is the author's love of adjectives' as it becomes 'cheesy.'

=== Awards ===
- Honorable Mention: Children/Young Adult at the Arab American Book Awards

== Themes ==
=== Dystopian ===
Dystopia is a prominent theme within the book as it it 'set in a dystopian society.' The government, 'known as The Reestablishment, an authoritarian, tyrannical government that controls its citizens to the highest degree and treats only those with a military use fairly.'

The Suffolk Journal reported on Mafi's book tour for Mafi's new novel 'Escape Me,' another dystopian novel. Mafi was asked about why she 'decided to write about this dystopian world' and she replied 'by saying that authors who struggle with real life problems that they cannot control often resort to their writing to discover solutions.' Mafi 'mentioned the issue of our 'decaying world' and unchecked technology, and that she is simply writing what she thinks is the 'worst-case scenario.'

=== Isolation ===
'When Juliette's parents learned that her touch could be lethal, they isolated themselves from her and abused her both verbally and physically. Thus, parental care is something alien to Juliette'

=== Oppression ===
Juliette is locked away because of her power, as she is considered 'unnatural' and different from everyone else.

== Characters ==
- Juliette Ferrars: Juliette starts off as a scared, traumatized 17-year-old girl, having been abused, locked away, and made to feel like a monster her entire life. She struggles to trust others and has trouble making friends, due to her lethal touch. Throughout the series, she learns to control her powers and becomes more brave and confident thanks to the help of training at Omega Point. Despite being friendless for most of her life, Juliette is compassionate and kind and easily sympathizes with those who are vulnerable. Juliette can also easily be influenced and manipulated and has fluctuating confidence.
- Aaron Warner: 19-year-old leader of Sector 45 in the Reestablishment, he is 5'9, has beautiful green eyes, golden blond hair and is considered inhumanly handsome; shown as a very cold and manipulative person. Warner gradually changes into a more loving human being as the books progress. From the beginning of the series, he is desperately in love with Juliette, which for a while was an obsession. Juliette develops empathy for Warner, despite him seeming cold and ruthless, and asserts him as a normal human, despite his denials. He is known to always assume the worst of himself. He can touch Juliette without consequence.
- Kenji Kishimoto: A 20-year-old soldier in Warner's army who is friends with Adam. He is later found out to be a member of Omega Point and is shown to have the gift of invisibility. He has a very joking personality and is a very chill person. He is also very egotistical and that adds humor to his person. He is also known to develop an admiration for Juliette which she returns and they form a strong bond, as best friends, almost like siblings. In an interview with Lifestyle.Inq in 2013, Mafi said that Kenji is 'very much inspired my brothers. He is so much the compilation of my brothers personalities'
- James Kent: Adam's 10-year-old younger brother. He is extremely mature for his age. He is very intuitive and curious to the world around him. He greatly admires Adam.
- Castle: Leader of the Rebellion (Omega Point). Castle is a forty-four-year-old scientist with telekinetic powers. He is portrayed as a wise, fair, and compassionate person. He is highly knowledgeable and is the first one who accepts Juliette as she joins the Rebellion, although he keeps many secrets about her true identity from her.
- Adam Kent: A soldier in the army, 18 years old; he is in charge of Juliette after she is brought out of isolation. He is known as a handsome man with blue eyes, tattoos, around 5'11", and dark brown hair. He was in love with Juliette since they first saw/met each other as children. He can touch Juliette by using his powers but it is extremely draining and sometimes painful for him.
- Paris Anderson: He is The Supreme Commander of Sector 45, who is in charge of an oppressive and violent regime. He is the father of Aaron Warner.

== Sequels ==
Series list:

Book	Image	Publication Date	Counts	ISBN	Summary
1. Shatter Me		2011		9781405291750	
1.5 Destroy Me		2012		9780062208194	
2. Unravel Me		2013		9781405291767	'Unravel Me' takes place in the hidden headquarters of the movement of Omega Point, led by Castle, which resists the oppressive regime of The Reestablishment. Juliette, the protagonist, learns more about her power of lethal touch, and soon enough realises that she is endangering Adam. Adam is not immune to her; he has to work to defend himself against her lethal touch, which weakens him, putting a strain on their relationship. Angry by Juliette's escape, 'The Supreme Commander' eventually arrives at Omega Point, wanting to meet and 'talk,' while haven taken Winston, Brendan, Emory and Ian (members of Omega Point) hostage. Therefore, Castle instructs Juliette that she must prepare for battle. Juliette meets the Supreme Commander at the specific house '1542 Sycamore,' where she finds not only the Supreme Commander but also his son, Warner. Juliette's powers get unleashed onto Anderson, and she also shoots him in the leg. Adam and Kenji enter the house, where it is revealed that Anderson is also the father of Adam. Kenji captures Warner and imprisons him at Omega Point, and Juliette visits him in his holding room, where a bond starts to form between the pair. Castle reveals that Warner has powers as he is immune to Juliette's lethal touch, which they were able to discover through holding him at the headquarters, which Warner eventually escapes from, which he asks Juliette to join him in leaving. In a battle against Anderson's men, Juliette is captured by him, and imprisoned in Warner's mother's house, and she is shot in the chest by the Supreme Commander.
2.5 Fracture me		2013		9780062284839	
3. Ignite Me		2014		9781405291774	Juliette wakes up and finds that she is back in the bedroom of Warner's headquarters, where Warner says that he had to hide her as everyone thinks that she has died. It is revealed that the battle is over, as everyone has died. Warner apologises to Juliette about his instruction for her to torture a child, as he unveils that it was a meer simulation, being a soundproof room, equipped with nothing but sensors and cameras. Despite the tragedies of the war, Juliette finds that Kenji, Adam, Winston, Brendan, Castle, Lily, Ian, Alia and James are alive, all of them residing in Adam's old home. Tensions run between Adam and Juliette as he is angered towards her new alliance with Warner, the man he detests. The remaining surviving members of Omega Point join Juliette at Sector 45, Warner's headquarters, training to fight The Reestablishment.] Juliette returns to the house she was shot in, where Warner' mother lives. Except there is no woman on the empty bed, and the machines and lights have been turned off. Juliette witnesses a vulnerable Warner, who is collapsed in the corner, in a hysterical state. Back at sector 45, the training allows Juliette to control her power, as she is able to touch Kenji without causing him any harm. This adrenaline gives Juliette the confidence to finally tell Warner that she loves him, and this marks the start of their romance. Warner addresses the soldiers of Sector 45, announcing that Juliette is alive, and he gives her a platform, allowing for her to declare that she wants 'to destroy The Reestablishment' and lead them into battle. Juliette then uses her power to demonstrate her ability to lead and control, using her energy to knock the soldiers back. The protagonist's speech is successful, with the soldiers holding a strong respect for her and her lead. Adam accidentally reveals that Anderson is his dad to Warner as he knows his first name as 'Paris' which is highly secretive information. The group embark on a mission with the sole purpose of killing Anderson, The Supreme Commander, by hijacking his ship - Juliette shoots him in the forehead with a gun.
4. Restore Me		2018		9781780318554	This book takes place 16 days after Juliette shot Anderson in the forehead, making her the new Supreme Commander of Sector 45. Through Warner's perspective, it is revealed that he is struggling due to the death of his father, leaving him a lonely, grieving son. Warner also reminisces on his past, remembering how his father taught him how to shoot a gun at the young age of nine, and how his father forced him to watch him skin dead animals. Juliette's new role brings on lots of responsibilities, as she is expected to interact with the other Supreme Commanders of the world, which she is unprepared for. Her first visit is Haider Ibrahim, who is the eldest son of the supreme commander of Asia, and his sister, Nazeera. While on a walk, Juliette is the target of an attempted assassination, and Nazeera saves her, killing the assassin. It is revealed by Castle that Juliette has a sister called Emmaline, and they have been in the custody of The Reestablishment for twelve years and are part of an 'ongoing experiment for genetic testing and manipulation', whose parents offered them willingly to The Reestablishment. The sisters are 'unnaturals' meaning that they have abilities - with Emmaline having psychokinesis. Juliette finds out about her sister through Warner and is distraught, overwhelmed with emotions. Juliette starts speaking to the soldiers, denouncing The Reestablishment. However chaos is introduced when a shot is fired at Juliette, and she loses control of her power, and the strong force kills all the soldiers. Following this strong force, Juliette's parents arrive, and state that they are taking her home. Juliette awakens and she is in a child's bedroom, and there are pictures of her when she was younger with her sister and with Aaron.
4.5 Shadow Me		2019		9780062906267	
5. Defy Me		2019		9780755502943	This book switches between the narrative perspectives of Warner, Kenji and Juliette (Ella). Defy Me starts with the narrator perspective Kenji, as he remembers Juliette being taken by her parents, which is then followed by Warner's perspective of an early memory of him and Juliette as children. It is revealed that Adam and Juliette were childhood friends, as both their parents were Supreme Commanders, with her's being the leader of Oceania. In hopes of finding Juliette, Nazeera steals a plane with Kenji, allowing them to fly to Oceania to rescue the captured Juliette. Evie, Juliette's mother uses her daughter as an experiment, in the hopes of turning her into a weapon, and wiping her brain clear of memories. However, what Evie does not realise is that Emmaline is able to reach out to her sister through the bond of their abilities, commanding her sister to, for example, 'Run.' Warner has also been captured by Evie and Max , and when he awakens, he is greeted by his father. Anderson tells his son that Juliette was 'designed to become a tool for war.' Aaron realises that his father has been tampering his memories and stealing them, explaining why he did not remember his memories with Juliette (Ella) from when they were younger. Emmaline commands Juliette and leads her sister towards her. However, it is a site of horror as Emmaline is trapped in a tall glass cylinder, who is dying - she no longer has a face, with her nose melted into her skull. However, Juliette is met with Evie, who points at gun towards her own daughter; Ella manages to escape by punching her mother and running away, where she encounters Kenji, and they run to the plane. Aaron also encounters Nazeera and the pair follow further behind and board the plane. Despite them flying in the air on the plane, they are soon shot down from the sky, forcing them to jump out of the plane to escape. Once they have landed, they encounter with Castle, and they meet his daughter, Nouria, who is the leader of The Sanctuary, the place they have landed in. Castle admits he shot down their plane as they would have been unable to radio to tell them to land here, as they would have been tracked by The Reestablishment. The group take shelter in The Sanctuary, where they experience their first moment of joy and peace.
5.5 Reveal Me		2019		9780062906274	
6. Imagine Me		2020		9780755502967	Despite taking shelter in The Sanctuary far away from Oceania, Emmaline still contacts her sister through her mind. However, these contacts are more powerful, as Emmaline has the ability to control her sister's body. This contact causes a huge eruption in the ground, with Juliette being completely controlled by her sister, and was having to be held by Aaron, who was 'barely hanging on to her.' The power causes Juliette to convulse, and have a full body seizure. However, due to the strong power, this allows The Reestablishment to find The Sanctuary, where they invade and kill lots of innocent civilians. Anderson captures Juliette, imprisoning her back at Oceania. Juliette's memory has been wiped, and is being used as a supreme soldier for the North American Commander. In The Sanctuary, James reveals that he was not tortured by Anderson as Adam 'offered his allegiance in exchange for protection,' and Adam gave Anderson his powers. Kenji, Nazeera and Warner steal a plane from the air base in a mission to rescue Juliette from Oceania once again. In the plane, Kenji reveals that before her capture, Aaron and Juliette got engaged. As they arrive at the Oceania air base their plane gets overridden, so all three jump out of the plane as it lands, using invisibility. Nazeera has a plan to trick the systems in the database to think that Aaron and Juliette (Ella's) familes are linked, so that he can be granted easy access to the high security rooms. When inside, Aaron and Kenji see Ibrahim pulling a gun on Anderson, and shoot Anderson, while instructing the brainwashes Juliette to follow his instructions and orders. Following this, Aaron pulls back his invisibility from Kenji and uses his abilities to kill Ibrahim, to stop him from controlling Juliette. Warner follows the brainwashed Juliette, determined to help return her original memories back to her. However, she fights him, as she does not know who he is. In Juliette's perspective, she states that there is 'something strange about him. Something about him that's getting under [her] skin.' Juliette [Ella] proceeds to tell him that he is 'unusually beautiful.' Aaron is very soft with her, gently touching her, and kissing her, in hopes of triggering her memory. After Aaron kisses her, Juliette begins to sob, and realisation hits her, and she breathes out his name. Aaron and Juliette immediately go to find Emmaline, who begs her sister to kill her, to remove the pain. Therefore, Juliette rips the tubes from her sister's body, and she and Warner carry her body home.
6.5 Believe Me		2021		9780008518059	

Shatter Me is the first in its series. An e-book novella told from Warner's point of view, Destroy Me, set after Shatter Me and before the sequel, was released on October 6, 2012. Unravel Me, the second book in the series, was released on February 5, 2013. A second e-book novella titled Fracture Me, set during and soon after the final moments of Unravel Me, told from Adam's point of view, was released on December 17, 2013. The third book in the series, titled Ignite Me, was released on February 4, 2014. On the same day, Unite Me, containing the two novellas combined into print for the first time as well as an exclusive look into Juliette's journal, was also released.

In April 2017, it was announced that Mafi would be releasing three more books in the Shatter Me series starting with Restore Me, which was published on March 6, 2018. A novella entitled Shadow Me, told from Kenji's perspective, was released on March 5, 2019. A month later, the fifth book in the series, Defy Me, was released. The sixth and final main installment of Shatter Me, titled "Imagine Me", was released on March 31, 2020.

Believe Me, a fifth novella written from Warner's point of view, was released on November 16, 2021.

On August 20, 2024, Mafi announced a spin-off series entitled Shatter Me: The New Republic. The first installation, Watch Me, was released on April 15, 2025. It is set ten years after the events of Believe Me and focuses on James Anderson's quest to stamp out The Reestablishment's last remaining refuge on Ark Island.

== Planned film adaptation ==
Film rights for Shatter Me were optioned by 20th Century Fox in 2011, prior to the novel's release date.

In June 2026, Warner Bros. Pictures announced that it had acquired the film rights to the book series.

In an interview with 'Woman's World' Tahereh Mafi revealed that 'Warner Brothers has been really great, understanding' and that she has been having 'lengthy discussions about the fandom and the characters and the storyline.' When talking about the cast of the upcoming film, Mafi 'made it clear that she doesn't 'fan cast' but she does want 'to see actors who are maybe new.'
