= A Map of Days =

2018 book by Ransom Riggs

- Author: Ransom Riggs
- Cover artist: From the collection of David Bass
- Language: English
- Genre: Young adult, dark fantasy
- Publisher: Dutton Books for Young Readers
- Publication place: United States
- English publication date: October 2, 2018
- Media type: Print, e-book, audiobook
- Pages: 496 pp.
- ISBN: 9780735232143
- Preceded by: Library of Souls
- Followed by: The Conference of the Birds

A Map of Days is a sequel to 2015 novel Library of Souls written by Ransom Riggs and fourth book in the series of Miss Peregrine's Home for Peculiar Children. It was released on October 2, 2018 by Dutton Books for Young Readers. This is the fourth book in the series and the first installment of a new trilogy set in the United States; it features the main protagonists from the original trilogy as well as introducing several new key characters.

== Plot ==
Jacob Portman is shocked by his friend's presence in the modern day. With Miss Peregrine's support, he tells his parents everything. His father recounts a peculiar-related memory and says he wants to forget everything. He scolds Jacob for siding with Abe. Miss Peregrine wipes the memories of Jacob's parents. Jacob wants to leave his normal life behind, but she says he is meant for both worlds.

While out on a shopping trip, Jacob accidentally turns onto Abe's old street, and those with him want to see his house. After cleaning it up, the children find a secret passageway containing Abe's shelter and mission log. Miss Peregrine takes them to the Devil's Acre. Sharon is now in charge of Bentham's machine, the Panloopticon, and the house has been turned into a terminal and shelter for peculiars. At the temporary headquarters of the Council of Ymbrynes, Miss Cuckoo and Miss Peregrine ask Jacob to speak about the battle with Caul to boost morale. After receiving a matchbook from Lester Noble Jr., Jacob calls the number and says he wants to continue Abe's work. He and Emma follow H's instructions to a diner and are sent into a loop, where a hollow attacks. Before they could kill it, H calls off the hollowgast, Horatio, and says Jacob is hired. H says he and Abe's group hunted hollows and rescued peculiar children. H gives them packages to bring to Florida and New York.

Jacob and Emma find a hidden passageway to Abe's cars and, along with Millard, Bronwyn, and Enoch, drive to Mermaid Fantasyland in Florida. They meet Paul, who leads them into a loop to escape the police. At the Flamingo Manor, they give Billie a package and learn that wights killed most of the ymbrynes in America, leaving mostly demi-ymbrynes, who can maintain a loop but do not possess the other abilities of an ymbryne. They fight off the gang "police" they fled earlier, and Paul agrees to take them to a portal in his hometown, Georgia. On the way, Paul, who is black, refuses to enter a diner. Jacob realizes they are in the Deep South in the time of segregation.

They enter the loop in 1935 and meet Elmer and Joseph, who describe someone named Gandy and show Jacob a photo of a younger H and V, H's travel companion. Jacob discovers Gandy is Abe. Jacob gives Annie the other package. She tells them about the Organization, a group of normals who want to eradicate peculiars from the country, and gives him a matchbook bearing a North Carolina address. At the North Carolina restaurant, they receive instructions to bring a peculiar from a Brooklyn high school to loop 10044. Jacob and Emma agree to put their relationship on hold, as it's revealed she is still not over Abe and had recently called him while in a loop. Those who are still at Jacob's house call to inform Jacob and the others that Miss Peregrine is out looking for them.

In New York City, they stay at a hotel where Abe had also stayed, a loop. At J. Edgar Hoover High School, they meet Lilly, a friend of Noor, the peculiar. Lilly takes them to an abandoned warehouse. Jacob ignores H's order to abort the mission. They meet Noor, who absorbs and releases light to blind the armed men who attack them. The children escape. Brownwyn, who had been shot with a dart, passes out. En route to the hospital, they are lured into a restaurant and, except for Lilly, taken into a loop. They meet Frankie, who calls together the clan leaders of New York for an auction. The group is brought by 1920s gangsters to Leo Burnham, who reprimands the leaders for attending an illegal auction. Leo wants to execute Jacob because Abe killed Leo's granddaughter, Agatha, along with other children. Jacob believes wights framed Abe. Leo's sister Donna, the Baroness, convinces him to pardon them. Leo detains Noor, but Jacob is released and met by his friends, Miss Peregrine, and Miss Cuckoo. They go through a loop to the Acre.

Miss Peregrine says the ymbrynes were working on a peace treaty with the Clans, and the group's actions have set them back. Jacob calls H, who says Abe wanted Jacob to have a normal life. H says he has one last job before he retires, which Jacob senses has to do with Noor. Sharon invites Jacob to a meeting. Jacob accepts a ticket but says he is not going against the ymbrynes. Jacob finds H's apartment and a dying H, with Noor unconscious nearby. H tells him to take Noor and seek V, as Noor and six other peculiars are the seven prophesied peculiars. H says although he and Abe did not kill any children themselves, they are responsible for their deaths. He lets Horatio eat his eyes as he dies. Horatio turns into a wight and leaves them directions before jumping out the window. Jacob and Noor set out to find V.

== Characters ==
=== Miss Peregrine's Peculiar Children ===
- Jacob Magellan Portman
- Emma Bloom
- Enoch O'Connor
- Millard Nullings
- Bronwyn Bruntley
- Olive Abroholos Elephanta
- Hugh Apiston
- Horace Somnusson
- Claire Densmore
- Fiona Frauenfield
- Victor Bruntley
- Thomas Odwell
- Joseph Odwell

=== Ymbrynes ===
A special type of peculiar who is able to transform into one particular type of bird (which they change their surname to), create and maintain timeloops, and alter memories. They are exclusively female, often seen as wise and levelheaded figures, and serve as caretakers and teachers of peculiar children usually by creating a timeloop as a sanctuary for them. They are

- Miss Peregrine
  - Also known as Alma Lefay Peregrine
- Miss Cuckoo

==== Demi-ymbrynes/Loop-keepers ====
- Norma Abernathy
- Rex
  - A drunk who visits several loops in Florida every few weeks to "wind the clocks", or maintain the timeloops

=== Hollow Hunters ===
- Jacob Portman
- Abraham Portman
- H
- V

=== Peculiars of the Flamingo Manor Loop ===
==== Residents of Flamingo Manor ====
- Paul (see peculiars of the Portal Loop)
- Miss Billie
- Adelaide Pollard
- Al Potts
- The Baroness (Donna)

==== Highwayman ====
- Darryl
- Jackson
- #3

=== Peculiars of the Portal Loop ===
==== Diviners ====
- Paul
- Miss Annie
- Alene Norcross
- June
- Fern
- Reggie
- Hawley
- Elmer
- Joseph

=== Peculiars of Old York City ===
- Noor
- Lilly
  - Peculiarity: none, a normal
  - Relationships: Noor's best friend, Millard's crush
  - A blind, artsy-type girl who attends J. Edgar Hoover High School in New York City.
- The Organization

=== Jacob's family ===
- Frank Portman
- Maryann Portman
- Uncle #1
- Uncle #2

=== Peculiars of Devil's Acres Loop ===
Sharon, a boatman first introduced to readers in Library Of Souls.
