= Library of Souls =

2014 young adult novel by Ransom Riggs

- Author: Ransom Riggs
- Language: English
- Genre: Young Adult, Dark Fantasy
- Publisher: Quirk Books
- Publication place: United States
- English publication date: September 22, 2015
- Media type: Print, e-book, audiobook
- Pages: 464 pp.
- ISBN: 9781594747588
- Preceded by: Hollow City
- Followed by: A Map of Days

Library of Souls is a sequel to 2014 novel Hollow City, written by Ransom Riggs, the third book in the series of Miss Peregrine's Home for Peculiar Children. It was released on September 22, 2015, by Quirk Books.

== Plot ==
After the events of the previous novel's ending, in which Jacob and Emma hide in a phone booth with Addison, Jacob discovers he has the ability to control hollowgasts as well as see them. Jacob then makes the hollow he's currently controlling back off, making it possible for the three to escape from the phone booth they're trapped in. They rest and prepare for the journey to rescue their friends and the kidnapped ymbrynes. The group manages to narrow down where their friends may have been taken and, with the help of a boatsman named Sharon, they cross over a polluted river by the name of Fever Ditch to a dilapidated village corrupted with drugs and run by the wights (Devil's Acre).

There they learn that the peculiar residents of Devil’s Acre engage in crime such as piracy and trading peculiar slaves. In some cases, peculiars have even put themselves up for viewing and sale. The worst of these peculiars have also become addicted to a specific drug known as ambrosia, which is taken by being poured into the eyes and dramatically strengthens a peculiar’s abilities. The drug also has the side effect of melting the user’s face after excessive use. This has led to frequent death matches between peculiars and other animals (including hollows), where the peculiars take the ambrosia to further augment their abilities. While trying to navigate their way around without being spotted, Addison is captured by wights while Jacob and Emma are seriously injured. They are rescued by a wealthy man and taken to his mansion to be healed. The man, Bentham, is revealed to be the one who caused the explosion in the Siberian tundra that created hollows and essentially wights (as told in the first book), and he is also Miss Peregrine's brother.

To prove that he truly wants to help, he unveils secret information about the wights and helps Jacob and Emma get into the wights' building using a hollow Jacob rescued from a cage in the fighting ring. The pair sneak into the building and manage to evade capture, but they also stumble upon a hospital complex where many peculiars are having their peculiar souls drained, including Melina and the echolocators. The other peculiar children, however, are nowhere to be found.

Emma and Jacob proceed to stop the draining operations, and successfully find their friends in a basement cell and free them, save for Fiona, who had supposedly died when the hollows and wights invaded the loop where the peculiar menagerie were living. With no time to mourn, the group come across the room where all the ymbrynes are being kept, but Caul already knows that Jacob and Emma are there. He then threatens to release a whole horde of hollows into the room with them and the ymbrynes unless Jacob is willing to use his ability to help him find the soul jars hidden in the legendary Library of Souls - a place where it was rumored peculiars kept their souls after their death for others to borrow later, but was later cut off from the rest of peculiardom after a horrible war that was also responsible for scattering peculiars across the world.

Despite that, Jacob does not give in to Caul's demands and instead uses his ability to control the hollows. The group then free Miss Peregrine and the rest of the trapped ymbrynes and fight their way through the building. The peculiar children manage to put up a good fight, but in the end are betrayed by Bentham, who wanted nothing more than to prove he could do some good for Miss Peregrine after she banished him, but sought revenge after she refused to forgive him. Caul takes the rest of the peculiars and ymbrynes hostage and forces them along with him to the Library of Souls, which Caul had managed to successfully rediscover. Here it is discovered that like his grandfather before him, Jacob is the only one who can see the soul jars hidden within the library. With Caul holding his friends hostage, Jacob obediently procures the most powerful soul jars for Caul and his brother, with the other wights dying because of ingesting the souls like ambrosia and not pouring them into a well where the souls can successfully bond with the user. Miss Peregrine's brothers grow into gigantic monsters who eventually end up dueling each other, but thanks to a recipe given to Jacob by Bentham that's used by the ymbrynes as the fight goes on, the library collapses in on Caul and Bentham.

With the help of Miss Peregrine and Emma following along with them, Jacob returns to his home, where his parents and a new psychiatrist are waiting for him, wanting to know what happened. Miss Peregrine and Emma tell them what happened before Miss Peregrine makes them forget, for the time being, everything that had just been told to them. Jacob and Emma decide to keep a regular correspondence with each other, but this later fails as his parents find a few of Emma's letters and assume Jacob wrote them to himself. They decide to send him to a mental asylum, but on the night they're supposed to leave, Miss Peregrine and her peculiar children come and visit Jacob, affirming his insistence to his shocked parents that the peculiars are indeed real. It is also revealed that, because of the loop closing around them, the internal time clocks of the peculiars have been restored so that they no longer have to worry about the years they've lived in loops catching up to them - they age like regular human beings while being in the present. Closing the book, Emma and Jacob decide to keep being friends for the time being before taking things slow in properly restarting their romantic relationship, now that they have time enough to do so.
