= Tahereh Mafi =

Iranian- American author (born 1986)

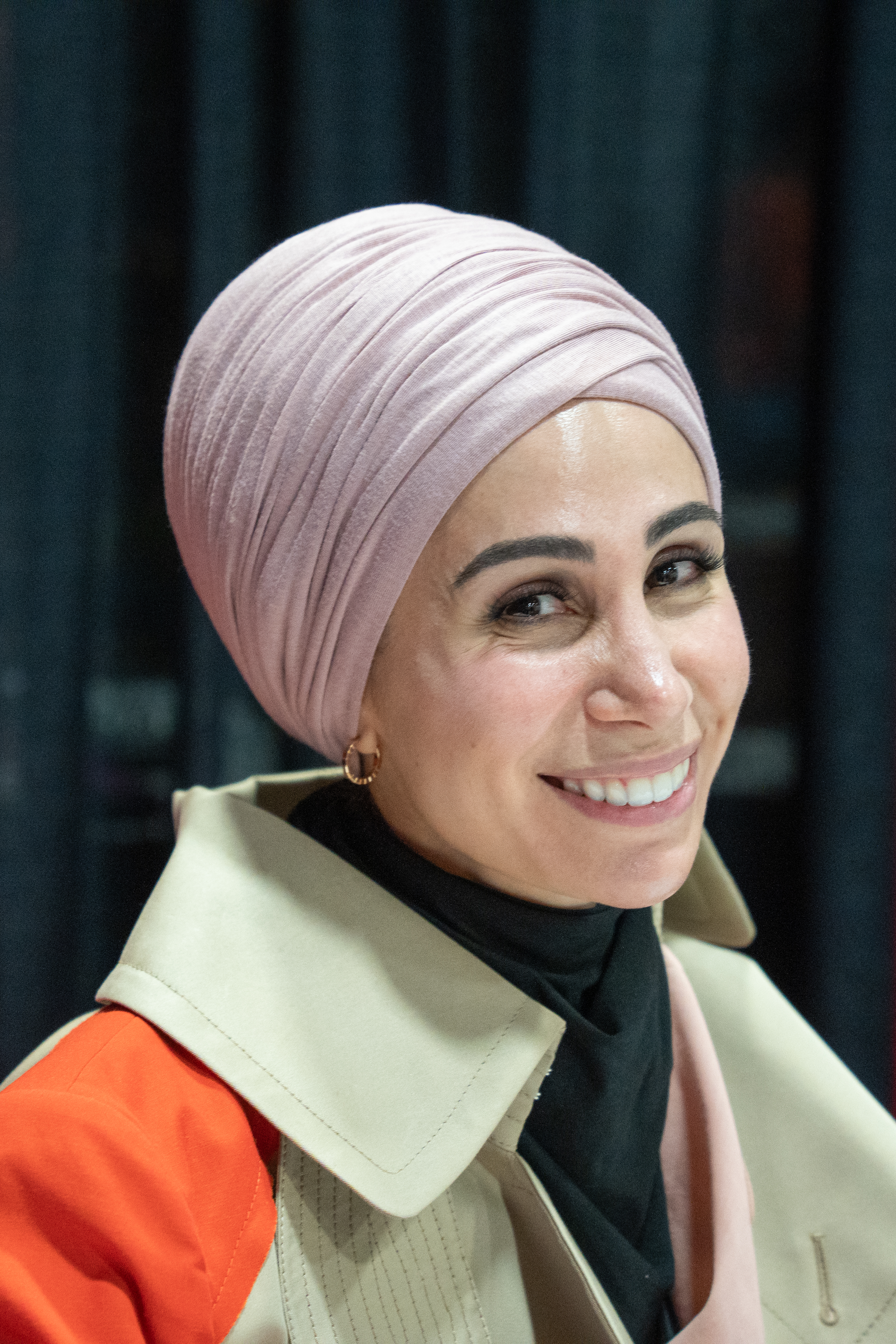
- Mafi at the National Book Festival 2025
- Born: November 9, 1988 (age 38); Connecticut, United States
- Education: Soka University
- Occupation: Author
- Spouse: Ransom Riggs (m. 2013)
- Children: 1
- Writing career
- Language: English
- Genre: Young Adult literature
- Notable work: Shatter Me
- Website: taherehmafi.com

Tahereh Mafi (November 10, 1988) is an Iranian-American author based in Santa Monica, California. She is known for writing young adult fiction.

== Early life ==
Mafi was born on November 9, 1988, in a small town in Connecticut. She is the youngest child of her family and has four older brothers. Mafi's parents are immigrants from Iran. At age 12 she moved with her family to Northern California and at age 14 they moved to Orange County.

Mafi graduated from University High School in Irvine, California. She later graduated from the Soka University of America in Aliso Viejo, California. She has varying levels of competency in eight different languages. She studied abroad in Barcelona, Spain for a semester in college. During this trip she had the opportunity to be fully immersed in the Spanish language.

In an interview with Lifestyle.Inq, Mafi said that she was an 'angry teenager' and she says 'I think I wanted to write a story about a girl who could go through something really intense and difficult and challenging and come through it ith grace, compassion and dignity.'

== Career ==
Mafi stated that before writing her first novel, Shatter Me, she wrote five manuscripts in order to better understand how to write a book.

Before Shatter Me, in the First Draft Podcast with Sarah Enni, Mafi revealed that she wrote 'five manuscripts before Shatter Me, and she described them all as 'awful.' Mafi would spend lots of time working on her manuscripts, with her saying 'I'd be committed to writing 5,000 words every single day.'

Shatter Me was published on November 15, 2011. Since then, Unravel Me (published on February 5, 2013) and Ignite Me (published on February 4, 2014) have been released. Mafi has 5 novellas that go with the Shatter Me series, Destroy Me, Fracture Me, Shadow Me, Reveal Me, and Believe Me. Film rights to Shatter Me have been purchased by 20th Century Fox.

In August 2016 Mafi released Furthermore, a middle-grade fiction novel about a pale girl living in a world of great color and magic of which she has none.

In April 2017, Mafi announced another trilogy in the Shatter Me universe following the same cast of characters. The first installment, Restore Me, is told from a dual-POV from Juliette Ferrars and Warner, the protagonist and antagonist, respectively, in the original trilogy. Restore Me was published on March 6, 2018.

Mafi's next book, A Very Large Expanse of Sea, was released on October 16, 2018. It was longlisted for the 2018 National Book Award for Young People's Literature.

== Personal life ==
As of 2014, Mafi lived in Irvine, California. In 2013, she married author Ransom Riggs. In March 2017, Mafi announced her pregnancy via Twitter. She gave birth to a daughter named Layla, on 30 May 2017. She identifies as Muslim.

== Bibliography ==
The Shatter Me series

- Shatter Me (2011)
- Unravel Me (2013)
- Ignite Me (2014)
- Restore Me (2018)
- Defy Me (2019)
- Imagine Me (2020)

Novellas

- Destroy Me (2012)
- Fracture Me (2013)
- Shadow Me (2019)
- Reveal Me (2019)
- Believe Me (2021)

The Shatter Me series: The New Republic (spin-off to The Shatter Me series)

- Watch Me (2025)
- Release Me (2026)
- Escape Me (2026)

Furthermore series

- Furthermore (2016)
- Whichwood (2017)

This Woven Kingdom series

- This Woven Kingdom (2022)
- These Infinite Threads (2023)
- All This Twisted Glory (2024)
- Every Spiral of Fate (2025)
- And The Stars Align (2027)

Standalones

- A Very Large Expanse of Sea (2018)
- An Emotion of Great Delight (2021)

Compilations

- Unite Me (2014) (Compilation of Destroy Me and Fracture Me)
- Find Me (2019) (Compilation of Shadow Me and Reveal Me)
