= Ransom Riggs =

American writer (born 1979)

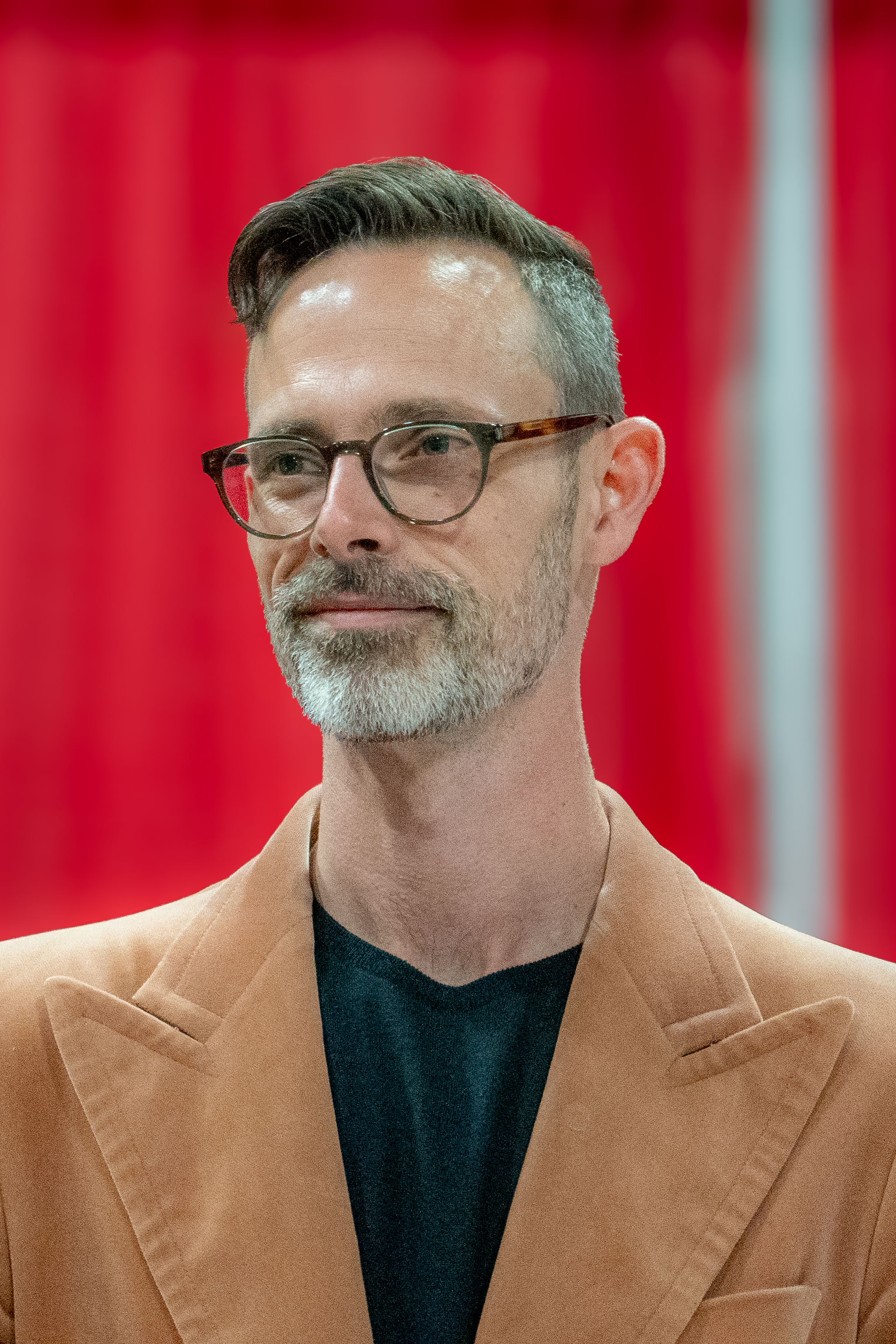
- Riggs at the National Book Festival 2025
- Born: February 3, 1979 (age 47); Maryland, U.S.
- Education: Kenyon College (BA); University of Southern California (MFA)
- Occupation: Author
- Spouse: Tahereh Mafi (m. 2013)
- Children: 1
- Writing career
- Genre: Children's literature
- Notable work: Miss Peregrine's Home for Peculiar Children
- Website: www.ransomriggs.com

Ransom Riggs (born February 3, 1979) is an American writer and filmmaker best known for the book Miss Peregrine's Home for Peculiar Children.

== Early life and education ==
Riggs was born in Maryland in 1979 on a 200-year-old farm, and grew up in Florida, where he attended Pine View School for the Gifted. He studied English literature at Kenyon College in Ohio, where he was a good friend of John Green. He later studied film at the University of Southern California.

== Career ==
His work on short films for the Internet and blogging for Mental Floss got him a job writing The Sherlock Holmes Handbook which was released as a tie-in to the 2009 Sherlock Holmes film.

Riggs had collected curious vernacular photographs and approached his publisher, Quirk Books, about using some of them in a picture book. On the suggestion of an editor, Riggs used the photographs as a guide from which to put together a narrative. The resulting book was Miss Peregrine's Home for Peculiar Children, which made The New York Times Best Seller list, and was adapted into the 2016 film of the same name.

Another book inspired by old photographs, Talking Pictures, was published by HarperCollins in October 2012.

The second novel in the Miss Peregrine series, Hollow City, was released in January 2014, with the third installment, Library of Souls, following in September 2015. A spin-off book of short stories, Tales of the Peculiar, was released in September 2016. The fourth novel in the series, A Map of Days, was released in October 2018. The fifth novel in the series, The Conference of the Birds, was released in January 2020. The sixth, The Desolations of Devil's Acre, was released on February 23, 2021.

== Personal life ==
Riggs married author Tahereh Mafi in 2013. They lived in Santa Monica, California and later moved to Irvine, California. Their first child, a daughter, Layla, was born on May 30, 2017.

== Works ==
=== Miss Peregrine series ===
- Miss Peregrine's Home for Peculiar Children (2011)
- Hollow City (2014)
- Library of Souls (2015)
- A Map of Days (2018)
- The Conference of the Birds (2020)
- The Desolations of Devil's Acre (2021)

==== Companion books ====
- Tales of the Peculiar (2016), short stories collection
- Miss Peregrine's Museum of Wonders: An Indispensable Guide to the Dangers and Delights of the Peculiar World for the Instruction of New Arrivals (2022)

=== Sunderworld series ===
- Sunderworld, Vol. I: The Extraordinary Disappointments of Leopold Berry (2024)
- Sunderworld, Vol. II: The Unfortunate Responsibilities of Leopold Berry (2026)

=== Comics ===
==== Miss Peregrine series ====
- Miss Peregrine's Home for Peculiar Children: The Graphic Novel (2011), with Cassandra Jean
- Hollow City: The Graphic Novel (2016), with Cassandra Jean

=== Non-fiction ===
- The Sherlock Holmes Handbook: The Methods and Mysteries of the World's Greatest Detective (2009), guide
- Talking Pictures: Images and Messages Rescued from the Past (2012), photographies

== Adaptations ==
- Miss Peregrine's Home for Peculiar Children (2016), film directed by Tim Burton, based on young adult novel Miss Peregrine's Home for Peculiar Children
