= Hollow City (novel) =

2014 dark fantasy novel by Ransom Riggs

- Hardcover edition
- Author: Ransom Riggs
- Language: English
- Genre: Young Adult, Horror,
- Publisher: Quirk Books
- Publication place: United States
- English publication date: January 14, 2014
- Media type: Print, e-book, audiobook
- Pages: 396 pp.
- ISBN: 978-1-59474-612-3
- Preceded by: Miss Peregrine's Home for Peculiar Children
- Followed by: Library of Souls

Hollow City is a 2014 dark fantasy novel and a sequel to Miss Peregrine's Home for Peculiar Children written by Ransom Riggs. It was released on January 14, 2014, by Quirk Books. The novel is set right after the first, and sees Jacob and his friends fleeing from Miss Peregrine's to the "peculiar capital of the world", London. A graphic novel adaptation of the book, illustrated by Cassandra Jean, was published in 2016.

== Plot ==
After fleeing in boats from the hollowgasts, the peculiar children are caught up in a bad storm and need to find land. They land on a beach only to find that the wights are trying to track them down, so they flee into the forests of the mainland. With nowhere to run, the group wander aimlessly, until they find a statue they had read about in The Tales of the Peculiar. There, they discover a time loop with the help of their aforementioned book, The Tales of the Peculiar, and escape into it. Surprisingly, it is full of peculiar animals, including a dog named Addison who can speak, who embrace and thank them for killing a hollow that had for a long time roamed in the time loop. After learning that Miss Wren, the ymbryne of this unique menagerie time loop, had flown to London to rescue her fellow ymbrynes, the peculiar children leave in search of her, in hopes that she can turn Miss Peregrine back into a human, before her human self is lost forever. They travel with Gypsies whose leader has a peculiar son.

While trying to board a train, they are ambushed by wights and held in a small shed at gunpoint until Hugh, who had managed to evade capture, uses the bees in his stomach to save his friends. The group then continues on their journey and intercepts the train to board, and finds Miss Peregrine, whom they had accidentally left on the train in Bronwyn's trunk previously.

In the city, they see horrible things left by bombers as they search for Miss Wren's flock of peculiar pigeons, which the group believes can lead them to her; they find a young girl named Sam who can suffer bad injuries and be made new, although she presumably doesn't survive the war. They manage to make it to St Paul's Cathedral thanks to the book, where they enter an underground crypt and find two peculiar children named Joel and Peter, who are echolocators and seem to share one mind. The brothers then lead them to where the pigeons usually stay. Only Emma, Jacob, and Horace enter into the usual place of the pigeons and follow the flutter of the pigeon's wings up to the attic where they meet an aggressive girl named Melina Manon, who is a peculiar teenager gifted with telekinesis. Melina initially distrusts them, but after Horace proves his peculiarity she begs to travel with them, bringing along a pigeon that they believe will lead them to Miss Wren. They finally reach a time loop which leads them to Miss Wren. However, the pigeon with her has been murdered by 'Miss Peregrine.' Miss Wren was hiding in a building coated in thick ice to prevent wights from entering and proceeds to help Miss Peregrine retain her human form once again, which she estimates will take the whole night. Meanwhile, Jacob, Millard, and Emma deduce that the wights are extracting peculiar souls and feeding them to hollowgasts, allowing them to attain the ability to pass through time loops.

Miss Wren is finally able to allow Miss Peregrine to change back into human form, but everyone is shocked to find out that the falcon is not Miss Peregrine at all, but her brother Caul, a wight. He reveals that it was himself and not Miss Peregrine that the children rescued from the submarine and that he has been following them to gain access to Miss Wren's menagerie and find Miss Wren herself, the only ymbryne that had managed to evade capture. Contacting the other wights, they proceed to kidnap every peculiar person in the building. While being marched away, Jacob manages to buy Emma time for her to melt their cuffs and escape into a phone booth in the present, where they meet Addison, who has been tracking them the whole time. Jacob uses his cell phone to call his father to reassure him that he is alive, and discovers he has yet another hidden talent apart from seeing hollowgasts – the ability to speak to and control them as well.

== Reception ==
Hollow City was well received by critics.

Booklist highlighted how, like the first novel, Hollow City is "generously illustrated with peculiar period photographs that capture and enhance the eerie mood and mode." Shelf Awareness similarly noted, "Vintage photographs add to the novel's haunting atmosphere." Also commenting on the inclusion of the photographs, Kirkus Reviews noted, "Though less of a novelty here than in the opener, these still add distinctly creepy notes (even when the subject is supposedly comical) to a tale already well-stocked with soul eaters and tentacled monsters."

Kirkus Reviews said the novel was "[l]ess a straightforward horrorfest than a tasty adventure for any reader with an appetite for the…peculiar."

Shelf Awareness further wrote, "Riggs masterfully builds suspense while revealing new information about the peculiars' world, making it at once sinister and captivating. A surprising twist at the end will keep readers on the edge of their seats and leaves the story poised for a third installment." Booklist also made note of the upcoming book, saying, "Fans will be pleased with this second volume and downright delighted to know that a third in the series is in the offing."

In 2014, AudioFile included the audiobook rendition of Hollow City, narrated by Kirby Heyborne, on their list of the best audiobooks for young adults published that year. The American Library Association also included the audiobook on their annual list of Amazing Audiobooks for Young Adults.

== Sequel ==
The third installment in Miss Peregrine's series, titled Library of Souls, was released on September 22, 2015.
