= Miss Peregrine's Home for Peculiar Children =

2011 novel by Ransom Riggs

- Cover photograph courtesy of Yefim Tovbis
- Author: Ransom Riggs
- Language: English
- Genre: Young Adult, Fantasy
- Publisher: Quirk Books
- Publication place: United States
- English publication date: June 7, 2011
- Media type: Print, e-book, audiobook
- Pages: 352
- ISBN: 978-1-59474-476-1
- OCLC: 664668604
- Followed by: Hollow City

Miss Peregrine's Home for Peculiar Children is a 2011 contemporary fantasy debut novel by American author Ransom Riggs. The story is told through a combination of narrative and a mix of vernacular and found photography from the personal archives of collectors listed by the author.

This young adult book was originally intended to be a picture book featuring photographs Riggs had collected, but on the advice of an editor at Quirk Books, he used the photographs as a guide from which to put together a narrative. Riggs was a collector of photographs, but needed more for his novel. He met Leonard Lightfoot, a well-known collector at the Rose Bowl Flea Market, and was introduced to other collectors. The result was a story about a boy who follows clues from his grandfather's old photographs, tales, and his grandfather's last words which lead him on an adventure that takes him to a large abandoned orphanage on Cairnholm, a fictional Welsh island.

The book has been a New York Times best seller. It reached the No. 1 spot on the Children's Chapter Books list on April 29, 2012, after being on the list for 45 weeks, remaining there until May 20, when it dropped to the fourth spot on the list. The book received generally positive reviews for creative use of vintage photographs in the sepia style, surrealist form, characterization and setting. The five sequels, Hollow City, Library of Souls, A Map of Days, The Conference of the Birds, and The Desolations of Devil's Acre were released in 2014, 2015, 2018, 2020, and 2021 respectively. A film adaptation was released in 2016.

== Plot ==
As a child, Jacob Magellan Portman is fascinated by his grandfather Abraham's stories about surviving as a Jew during World War II, running from man-eating monsters, and living with peculiar children in a secret home guarded by "a wise old bird." As Jacob grows older, he doubts the stories until his grandfather's death. Abraham's last words, delivered while he is blood-strewn, exhausted, and lying in his back garden on the outskirts of Florida Woods, are a mystery: "...find the bird in the loop on the other side of the old man's grave on September 3, 1940, and tell them what happened." As Abraham dies, Jacob sees a horrific monster like the ones described in Abraham's stories. Soon, he starts experiencing trauma and nightmares relating to those monsters. Jacob's parents take him to psychiatrist Dr. Golan, who suggests that Jacob go to Cairnholm, Wales, the location of the children's home where Abraham grew up, to confront his trauma. Jacob finds the house, only to learn that it was abandoned and became haunted after a bomb killed all its inhabitants on September 3, 1940.

After returning to the house, Jacob encounters a mysterious girl who can conjure fire with her hands. He follows her, trying to question her after hearing her call out his grandfather's name. They reach the bogs surrounding the house before Jacob realizes that the people of Cairnholm are different, including the patrons at the inn, his father among the absent. Jacob is rescued by the mysterious girl and an invisible boy, who introduce themselves as Emma Bloom and Millard Nullings, respectively. A suspicious Emma holds him captive and brings him to the children's home, where he finds it magically transformed into the paradise of his grandfather's stories, complete with the peculiar children and the "wise old bird", headmistress Alma Peregrine.

Jacob is introduced to other peculiar children: Bronwyn Bruntley, a girl with incredible strength; Claire Densmore, a little girl with an extra mouth at the back of her head; Olive Abroholos Elephanta, a little girl who is lighter than air; Enoch O'Connor, a boy who can animate non-living things for a short amount of time by transplanting organs; Hugh Apiston, a boy with bees living in his stomach; Fiona Frauenfeld, a girl with an affinity for growing plants; and Horace Somnusson, a boy with prophetic dreams. Olive and Millard explain that the children reside in a time loop, a place where time is constantly reversed and where they all relive the same day every day: September 3, 1940. This is all thanks to Miss Peregrine, a special type of peculiar being known as an ymbryne who can shapeshift into birds (namely a peregrine falcon) and manipulate time. Apart from keeping them alive (the bomb would have killed them otherwise), this time loop protects the peculiar children from being hunted by hollowgast—humanoid, tentacle-mouthed creatures that devour peculiars. Hollowgasts who have consumed enough peculiars become wights: beings who resemble humans in every aspect save their eyes, which have no pupils. The ultimate goal of the wights is to gain power from the peculiars, as well as to transform their fellow hollowgast into wights that will rule the world.

Peregrine's former mentor Miss Avocet arrives in the loop mad with grief after her wards were kidnapped by wights. Fearing for the children's safety, Jacob is tasked with reporting any suspicious information from the outside world. Jacob and Emma begin to develop feelings for each other, as well as get a glimpse into his own peculiar self. Just like his grandfather, Jacob can see the invisible hollows. Peregrine's fears are confirmed when Martin, a worker in the Cairnholm museum, is killed. Enoch uses a sheep heart to briefly resurrect Martin, who informs the group of the presence of a wight on the island. A wight attacks the group, along with a hollow companion who reveals himself as Dr. Golan. Jacob refuses Golan's offer to join him in finding peculiars and decides to stay with his friends. Golan sends his hollow after the group, and Emma and Jacob split up from the rest. After a brief scuffle, Jacob kills the hollow with sheep shears. They make their way back to the orphanage, but discover that Golan has kidnapped Peregrine and Avocet and locked the rest of the children in the house.

Golan warns them not to attempt to rescue Peregrine and leaves the loop, but Millard manages to sneak out and follow him. Jacob and his friends follow Millard's tracks and find Golan near a lighthouse trying to catch a boat with his other wight comrades. During the process of saving Peregrine, who is trapped in her bird form, Golan is killed by Jacob. The other children arrive and rescue Peregrine, but Avocet is taken away. The children return to the orphanage and find it destroyed. They realize they must now track down the wights and discover how to help Peregrine. Jacob decides to follow his friends. He returns to the present to say goodbye to his father, but promises to return when his mission is finished. Guided by only a prophetic dream from Horace, the children set sail to find help.

== Setting ==
=== Peculiars ===
Otherwise known as syndrigasti (a word meaning "peculiar spirit" in the Old Peculiar language), peculiar folk are a branch of humanity possessing a second soul which manifests itself in strange ways such as abnormal characteristics and abilities commonly referred to as peculiarities or peculiardom. Peculiar children are rarely born to peculiar parents, as the essence or gene of peculiarity often skips generations.

=== Ymbrynes ===
An ymbryne (pronounced IMM-brinn) is a specific kind of female peculiar who can transform into distinct birds, control and manipulate time as she sees fit, and govern the peculiar world. Most essentially, the ability to control time allows a ymbryne to possess a period of historical time by looping it, creating a potentially eternal sanctuary for peculiars. They often set out into the present-day world to rescue peculiars in dire situations or to search for those without an ymbryne. Ymbryne means "revolution" or "circuit" in Old Peculiar.

=== Council of Ymbrynes ===
The Council of Ymbrynes is the official government and law of peculiardom. Their responsibilities include the maintenance of loop order, the writing or amending of laws on a regular basis, and the determination of sentences for those convicted of a crime. Members are not specified.

=== Time loops ===
Time loops are the fabric of the peculiar world, often referred to as peculiardom. Similar to towns, cities, states, and countries, they act as specific locations. Together, loops create a vast world of varying whereabouts and dates only peculiars are able to enter. Within these loops, peculiars live indefinitely without aging or reliving previous experiences, even as the day around them repeats itself. A loop must be reset daily or it will collapse, leaving all peculiars within it exposed to the outside world. As a result of time loops, those who reside in them may not be able to return to the present day, depending on how long they have been there. In a mere matter of hours outside of the loop, the amount of time evaded will catch up to them.

=== Hollowgast ===
The hollowgast are monsters with large tentacle-like tongues who feed on peculiars. They were created by a freak accident in an unethical and illegal experiment conducted by Miss Peregrine's two brothers that was intended to achieve immortality without the limitations of time loops. Instead, it led to a catastrophic collapse that destroyed half of Siberia, where the experiment took place. Everyone involved was presumed dead, but their corpses became deformed and transformed into a lesser, animalistic state of life. Apart from their shadows, hollows are invisible to all but a gifted few, including Abraham and Jacob Portman. Their souls having been erased, hollows possess no form of peculiarity, rendering them unable to enter loops.

=== Wights ===
If a hollow consumes enough peculiar souls, its original human form is restored, with the exception of irises and pupils leaving the eyes entirely white. Because of this, peculiars refer to these evolved creatures as wights. They possess no extraordinary abilities but are highly skilled in posing as normal people under multiple identities and are able to enter loops. Much of their existence revolves around procuring peculiars for remaining hollows to devour.

== Characters ==
=== Peculiar children ===
- Jacob Magellan Portman — A 16-year-old American teenager and the protagonist of the story. Jacob becomes subject to acute stress reaction after witnessing his grandfather's death and claiming that a monster from his grandfather's childhood stories had killed him. Everyone he knows begins to consider him crazy and avoids him, including his only friend, Ricky. His parents eventually take him to see a psychiatrist, on whose instruction Jacob's dad takes him on a trip to the Welsh island where his grandfather grew up. There, Jacob discovers that the stories of a magical orphanage and both peculiar children and the monster are real. He also learns that the ability to see these monsters is a rare peculiarity, as they are invisible to all but a few like himself.
- Abraham Ezra Portman — Abraham was Jacob's grandfather who also had the peculiarity of seeing the monsters. He left Peregrine's loop as a young man to join both the war against Germany and the war against the hollowgast, promising to make a home in America for his fellow peculiars. Having started a family of his own during his time in the normal world, he never went back for them. In spite of this, he was still pressured into eradicating hollows, resulting in long, frequent hunting-trips away from his wife and two children, a secret which they took as careless neglect. Over the years, Abraham became a near-stranger to everyone he knew and, in his old age, was killed by a hollowgast.
- Emma Bloom — Emma is a peculiar teenager under Peregrine's care with the ability to generate fire from her hands. Emma had a romantic relationship with Abraham which they maintained even as he went to war until he stopped responding to her letters. After years without replying, Abraham finally wrote her back simply to tell her he could no longer do so because he'd married another woman. Emma became heartbroken and bitter but still mourned him upon learning of his death when his grandson Jacob arrived in Peregrine's time loop. Although she treated Jacob harshly at first, their mutual sorrow for Abraham started a deeply sincere relationship between them.
- Millard Nullings — Millard is a young adolescent with the peculiarity of invisibility which is said to be quite uncommon. He chooses to go about nude to stay fully invisible, but wears clothes at supper on Peregrine's orders. He is also exceptionally well-versed in all things peculiar and, as a hobby, spends much of his time documenting every little detail of the day they live in.
- Bronwyn Bruntley — A young adolescent possessing super-human strength, Bronwyn is also kindhearted and a loyal friend. She respects and obeys Peregrine more than her fellow wards do, often correcting them and citing rules they're meant to follow, mostly in fear of anyone getting in trouble. The only occasions for which she refuses to cooperate are when she is made to dress ladylike. Before Peregrine took her and her older brother Victor in, Bronwyn discovered her own strength at the age of ten when she inadvertently snapped their abusive stepfather's neck.
- Enoch O'Connor — A young adolescent with the ability to resurrect the dead and bring inanimate objects to life for a limited time by using the extracted organs of other living things. Enoch was born to a family of undertakers and, before moving into time loops, caused tremendous confusion by frequently bringing the dead to life at his father's funeral parlor. He is the least liked of Peregrine's wards as the others are put off by his selfish behavior, negative thinking, and obsession with violence. His previous ymbryne was never specified, nor were his reasons for relocating to Peregrine's loop.
- Olive Abroholos Elephanta — Olive is the second youngest to Claire and comes across as quite giddy and openly friendly. Her peculiarity renders her lighter than air, making her float freely like a balloon. She has barely any control over it and must be weighted down or bound to something to keep from floating away, with her primary means of restraint being heavy leaden shoes.
- Hugh Apiston — Hugh is a teenager with bees living in his stomach. His peculiarity allows him to communicate with bees and command them. He is in love with Fiona Fraunfeld.
- Horace Somnusson — Horace is a young adolescent capable of having prophetic dreams, albeit very scarcely. They occur most often as nightmares of events so horrifying, they have a tendency to throw him into bouts of shock. He can be quite a snob and is an extremely passionate follower of fashion, commonly seen in a suit and tie with a top hat and monocle.
- Fiona Frauenfeld — Fiona is a teenager possessing power over plants. Her peculiarity allows her to manipulate their life and growth and control their movements. She speaks with a thick Irish accent, though she rarely speaks at all, and has a romantic, symbiotic relationship with Hugh.
- Claire Densmore — The youngest of Peregrine's wards, Claire also possesses the most grotesque peculiarity in their midst: a second mouth in the back of her head with sharp teeth, hidden beneath her blonde curls. She is typically cheerful but becomes shy and self-conscious when made to dine with others.
- Victor Bruntley — Peregrine once had many more peculiars under her care, many of whom were killed by the hollowgast, including Bronwyn's older brother Victor. Like Bronwyn, Victor possessed immense physical strength. He left during the loop's early days, claiming he could not stand being trapped there; it was a reckless decision which led to his death.

=== Ymbrynes ===
All ymbrynes take on last names which correspond to the type of bird into which they can shapeshift (e.g., Miss Peregrine can turn into a peregrine falcon).

- Alma LeFay Peregrine — Peregrine is a highly skilled ymbryne and the headmistress of her children's-home. She is a delicate woman who enjoys smoking a pipe and adores her charges, though she can be strict at times. At a very young age, she learned to hone her peculiarity as a student under Miss Avocet. Peregrine's loop is located on the fictional island of Cairnholm, Wales, on September 3, 1940.
- Esmerelda Avocet — Avocet is an elderly and wise woman from the mid-Victorian period in England. Having taught most notable ymbrynes to master their craft, she is regarded as near-royalty. Her loop is in Derbyshire on July 15, 1867, but it was invaded by wights and hollowgast, forcing her to flee to Peregrine's loop.
- Miss Nightjar — Nightjar takes in difficult cases of peculiars. One such case being Peregrine's former ward, Charlotte. Nightjar's loop is in Swansea, Wales on April 3, 1901, and is co-run by Thrush.
- Miss Finch — Finch has an aunt who is also an ymbryne but prefers to stay in finch form. Their loop is based in London, but the date is not stated.
- Millicent Thrush — Thrush has a loop in London and is headmistress of a children's home there but also co-runs Miss Nightjar's special-care home.
- Miss Kestrel — Possibly a rather historical ymbryne. Enoch mentions an old story of her being injured in a road accident. The incident is said to have trapped her in the form of a kestrel for an entire week, leading to the collapse of her loop before she healed. Location and date are not stated.
- Balenciaga Wren — Wren is the headmistress of a menagerie for peculiar animals. Her loop is based in mainland Wales in a much older, unknown time.
- Miss Gannett — Gannett has a loop in Ireland, in June 1770.
- Miss Treecreeper — Peregrine mentions her name but doesn't remember where or when her loop is based.

=== Normals ===
- Franklin Portman — Jacob's father, Frank, is an unemployed, amateur ornithologist who volunteers at a bird rescue and likes to pass it off as his job. He also spends much of his time writing manuscripts for nature books, though he's never completed one, giving up on his every project midway. His whole life, he's had a rather rough relationship with his own father, Abraham, as he was almost never around. Frank is very protective of his son, but understands his need for room to grow and learn on his own.
- Maryann Portman — Maryann is Jacob's obsessively materialistic mother and Franklin's wife. She comes from a wealthy family that owns a drugstore company with one hundred and fifteen branches across the state of Florida. While she loves her son and is immensely protective of him, she tends to be more concerned about public image and what people think of them.
- Dr. Jeff Golan — Dr. Golan was one of the many peculiars who supported and participated in the disastrous experiment that created the hollowgast. He is among those who have reached the state of being a wight, a term he disowns as "their word." He is a licensed psychiatrist and, in order to uncover information on Peregrine's loop, has been stalking the Portman family for years in disguise.
- Malthus — Malthus was once a peculiar and an old friend of Dr. Golan's who also joined the rebellion against the ymbrynes, dying by the results of the experiment designed to overthrow them and reemerging a hollow. He now travels with the restored Golan, devouring peculiars as they discover time loops. For reasons not specified, Golan allowed him to kill Abraham before they could learn the location of Peregrine's loop. From then on, Malthus haunted Jacob, keeping a vigil on him day and night.
- Martin Pagett — Martin is a part-time but knowledgeable and well-spoken curator of a small museum on Cairnholm, though due to the island's sparse renown and low tourist appeal, they rarely see any patronage. He strikes up a bond with Jacob, giving him a rundown of Cairnholm's history and assisting him in learning how the children's home was destroyed. Martin plays an unwitting but vital role in discovering Malthus and Dr. Golan on the island.
- Oggie — Oggie is Martin's uncle, whom he introduces to Jacob in order to help him learn more about the fallen children's home. Elderly and gruff but still sharp of wit, Oggie recalls the strange children and their reclusive headmistress and recounts the bombing in detail, occasionally veering off into rants on the weather and politics. Though he longed to fight for his country, he was too young then and merely watched it all take place.
- Susan Portman — Susan is Frank's younger sister and Jacob's aunt. While going through Abraham's possessions with them after his passing, she found his copy of The Selected Works of Ralph Waldo Emerson and that he had written a brief well-wish to Jacob on the title page. When she gives it to him on his birthday, Jacob unwittingly discovers a letter from Miss Peregrine when it fell out from between the pages.
- Ricky — Ricky is described as Jacob's best and only friend, though their relationship is more of a deal for personal benefit: in exchange for Jacob helping Ricky with his homework, Ricky acts as Jacob's bodyguard at school.

== Reception ==
Miss Peregrine's spent seventy weeks on The New York Times Best Sellers list for children's chapter books. It reached the number one spot on the list on April 29, 2012, after being on the list for forty-five weeks. It remained there until 20 May, when it dropped to the fourth spot on the list. The book dropped off the list on September 9, 2012, after sixty-three weeks.

According to Deborah Netburn for the Los Angeles Times, the best part of the novel is "a series of black-and-white photos sprinkled throughout the book". Publishers Weekly called the book "an enjoyable, eccentric read distinguished by well-developed characters, a believable Welsh setting, and some very creepy monsters."

== Sequels ==
A sequel, titled Hollow City, was released on January 14, 2014. The novel is set immediately after the first, and sees Jacob and his friends fleeing from Miss Peregrine's to the "peculiar capital of the world", London.

The third installment in the Miss Peregrine's series, titled Library of Souls, was announced in early 2015. It was released on September 22, 2015.

A Map of Days, the first installment of a new trilogy set in the United States and featuring the main protagonists from the original trilogy, was released on October 2, 2018, by Dutton Books for Young Readers (a division of Penguin Group).

On January 14, 2020, the fifth installment, The Conference of the Birds, was released.

On February 23, 2021, the sixth and final book of the second trilogy, The Desolations of Devil's Acre, was released.

== Adaptations ==
=== Graphic novel ===
An original graphic novel adaptation by Cassandra Jean and Ransom Riggs, called Miss Peregrine's Home for Peculiar Children: The Graphic Novel was released in October 2013.

=== Film ===
A film adaptation of the book was released in the United States on September 30, 2016. It was directed by Tim Burton from a screenplay by Jane Goldman. Eva Green played Miss Peregrine in the film, along with Asa Butterfield as Jacob, and Ella Purnell as Emma Bloom.
