= Sense and Sensibility and Sea Monsters =

2009 novel by Ben H. Winters

- First Edition Cover, 2009
- Author: Ben H. Winters (with Jane Austen attributed)
- Language: English
- Genre: Comic novel, historical fiction, horror, thriller, black comedy
- Published: September 15, 2009 Quirk Books, Philadelphia
- Publication place: United States
- Media type: Print (Paperback)
- Pages: 344
- ISBN: 978-1-59474-334-4
- OCLC: 429227304
- Preceded by: Pride and Prejudice and Zombies
- Followed by: Android Karenina

Sense and Sensibility and Sea Monsters (2009) is a parody novel by Ben H. Winters, with Jane Austen credited as co-author. It is a mashup story containing elements from Jane Austen's 1811 novel Sense and Sensibility and common tropes from sea monster stories. It is the thematic sequel to another 2009 novel from the same publisher called Pride and Prejudice and Zombies. It was first published by Quirk Books on September 15, 2009.

== Plot summary ==
The story follows the plot of Austen's novel, but sets it in an alternative universe in which an event known as "The Alteration" has turned the creatures of the sea against mankind. In addition, this unexplained event spawns numerous "sea monsters", including sea serpents, giant lobsters, and man-eating jellyfish.

Following the Dashwood family's move to Barton Cottage in the Devon archipelago, they are treated kindly by Sir John, who invites them to dine at his heavily fortified manor house on nearby Deadwind Island. They are soon introduced to Sir John's family and friends, including his wife (a former island princess whom Sir John kidnapped and carried back to Britain and makes an escape attempt every couple of weeks), her mother (also kidnapped by Sir John and now calling herself "Mrs. Jennings"), and Colonel Brandon, a quiet and reserved gentleman who is a part-man, part-squid mutant.

In this version of the story, Marianne falls into a rain-swollen creek and is attacked by an octopus, from which she is rescued by John Willoughby, a dashing adventurer and deep-sea diver who has come to the archipelago to visit his aunt. However, their budding romance is interrupted when Willoughby is called away to the undersea city of Sub-Marine Station Beta.

To cheer up Elinor and Marianne, the two elder Dashwood sisters, Mrs. Jennings offers to take them to the undersea station, a massive iron and glass dome housing a large city, public gardens, shops, and a research laboratory where scientists plot new ways to defeat their aquatic enemies. Here Marianne encounters Willoughby again, who leaves her to fend for herself against an attack of giant lobsters, and she later learns that he is engaged to the wealthy Miss Grey. Colonel Brandon too reveals Willoughby's former profligate character.

The vacation at Sub-Marine Station Beta is abruptly ended when schools of swordfish begin ramming the glass dome in the hopes of breaking it. They eventually succeed with the help of a narwhal and other sea creatures; the Dashwood sisters and their friends barely manage to escape before the dome breaks and floods. While riding an emergency ferry to the surface, Elinor encounters Edward's brother Robert Ferrars and is disheartened to see that Robert cares more for his newfound inheritance than for the fate of his brother.

The sisters and Mrs. Jennings retire to a houseboat but Marianne is attacked by mosquitoes and develops malaria. Colonel Brandon volunteers to swim to Barton Cottage and return with Mrs. Dashwood. This leaves Elinor and Mrs. Jennings to defend the boat against pirates. Hearing of Marianne's illness, Willoughby arrives and helps Elinor booby-trap the vessel. With the help of a special whistle that he brings, Elinor and Mrs. Jennings defend their boat by summoning a swarm of octopods, while the pirate chief is killed by the returning Colonel Brandon.

Upon their return, a servant reports to the Dashwoods that Edward has married his former betrothed, Lucy. The saddened Elinor is overcome by visions of a five-pointed star but, upon reflection, she realizes that the pain and visions have been with her (and always appear most forcefully) whenever Lucy is present. Sir John surmises that Lucy must be a sea witch – a monster that seduces human men and sucks the marrow from its victim's bones. Before Elinor can form a plan to save Edward, he himself arrives at Barton Cottage. The Dashwoods then learn that it was Robert Ferrars, not Edward, that has married Lucy and they resolve to leave Robert to his fate.

The island upon which Barton Cottage rests suddenly rises from the ocean but turns out to be a monstrous sea-beast known as Leviathan, awakened from a long slumber and hungry for all sorts of marine life. The characters survive the sudden upheaval of their former island home. Edward reconciles with his mother and asks Elinor to marry him. The couple begin a simple new life tending to the lighthouse presented him by the Colonel. Marianne resolves to become a marine engineer so that she can design a new Sub-Marine Station Gamma dome. Eventually too she marries Colonel Brandon, leaving Willoughby to regret his opportunistic choice of partner.

== Promotion ==
The novel was initially announced via a YouTube video on 13 July 2009; it has had over 400,000 views since it was uploaded. It features cover art similar to its predecessor—in that it appears to take a work of art and transform it into the theme of the novel. However, with Sense and Sensibility and Sea Monsters, the image is created by the artist.

== Reception ==
Entertainment Weekly gave Sense and Sensibility and Sea Monsters a rating of B− (in contrast to a rating of A− for Pride and Prejudice and Zombies), wondering "(c)an it be that in the rush to turn a charming book novelty into a renewable resource, the whole Austen-and-monsters series has already jumped the shark?"

The A.V. Club gave the novel a favorable review and a grade of A−, approving of Winters' "aggressive approach to transforming his assigned text into horror" and commenting that "instead of destroying the integrity of Austen's subtle romance, Winters' mysterious chanting natives, sea-witch curses, and undersea habitats move the story into a gothic realm".

New York Magazine gave the novel a mixed review, stating that "it's hard to say, in the end, if this is an homage, an exploitation, a deconstruction, or just a 300-page parlor trick. Although the sea-monster subplots, considered independently, rarely rise above pulp clichés, the book's best moments do achieve a kind of bizarro symbiosis".

The novel is the subject of literary analysis in the 2019 collection of essays Jane Austen and Comedy. In an essay in the book, Misty Krueger argues for the value of the monster mashup as a form of Austen adaptation. Krueger states that readers should "have fun with Sea Monsters' incongruous, carnivalesque doppelgängers and then...revisit Sense and Sensibility" to learn more about Austen's characters.

== See also ==
- Pride and Prejudice and Zombies
