= Ben H. Winters =

American author (born 1976)

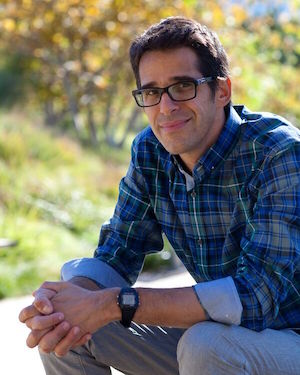
- Born: June 14, 1976 (age 50); Washington, D.C., U.S.
- Education: Washington University in St. Louis
- Occupation: Writer
- Writing career
- Period: 2009–present
- Website: benhwinters.com

Benjamin Allen "Ben" H. Winters (born June 14, 1976) is an American author. He is best known for mystery/sci-fi novels such as The Last Policeman and Underground Airlines, and for creating the CBS show Tracker.

== Early life and education ==
Winters was born in Washington, D.C. to a middle-class, Jewish family and grew up in Maryland. In high school, he played in the punk band Corm, alongside John Davis, now of Title Tracks. In 1998, he graduated from Washington University in St. Louis where he was active in the comedy group Mama's Pot Roast.

== Career ==
Winters was first known as the author of the 2009 New York Times bestseller Sense and Sensibility and Sea Monsters. In June 2010, Android Karenina was published by Quirk Books. A young adult novel, The Secret Life of Ms. Finkleman, was published by HarperCollins in September 2010. Finkleman was nominated for an Edgar Award by the Mystery Writers of America in January 2011. In 2011, Winters published a second book in the Ms. Finkleman series, titled The Mystery of the Missing Everything, and Bedbugs, a horror novel for adults. Winters has also written numerous books in the Worst-Case Scenario Series.

In 2012, Winters published The Last Policeman, the first in a trilogy of detective novels set in a pre-apocalyptic United States; that book won the Edgar Award from the Mystery Writers of America in the category Best Paperback Original; was an Amazon Best Book of 2012; and was nominated for the Macavity Award for Best Mystery by Mystery Readers International. The second novel in the Last Policeman trilogy, Countdown City, was published in July 2013; it won the 2014 Philip K. Dick Award for Distinguished Science Fiction. The third book in the Policeman series, World of Trouble, was published in July 2014. It was nominated for the Edgar Award in the category of Best Paperback Original and for the Anthony Award.

Winters's work for the theater includes the Off-Broadway musical Slut, the children's musicals The Midnight Ride of Paul Revere, Uncle Pirate, and A (Tooth) Fairy Tale and the Neil Sedaka juke-box musical, Breaking Up Is Hard to Do.

Winters's novel Underground Airlines was published by Mulholland Books in July 2016. It is an alternate history book, set in a present-day alternate universe in which the American Civil War never occurred, with human chattel slavery continuing to be practiced legally in four U.S. states as a result. In the book, the main character, a former slave and bounty hunter working for the U.S. government, attempts to infiltrate an abolitionist organization known as the "Underground Airlines" (a reference to the historical Underground Railroad). The book was an Indie Next pick for July 2016 and a New York Times bestseller. The book won the 2016 Sidewise Award for Alternate History.

His novel Golden State was published by Mulholland Books in January 2019. The novel imagines an alternate history version of Southern California in which objective reality is fetishized and protected above all things, and lying is the greatest crime imaginable. Winters has said the book was inspired by the rise of alternative facts and in particular by the argument about the crowd size at the 2017 presidential inauguration. Golden State was an Indie Next pick for January 2019 and a Book of the Month Club selection. Writing in the San Francisco Chronicle, Michael Berry called the novel "smart, intricate and propulsive" and "proof that Winters deserves our continued attention as one of crime fiction’s most inventive practitioners."

In 2021 Winters published The Quiet Boy. Reviewing The Quiet Boy in the New York Times, Sarah Lyall wrote "Winters is such a fine writer that by the time he asks you to suspend your disbelief, you’ll follow him anywhere." His thriller Big Time centering on two average women caught up in the world of corporate espionage, arrived March 2024. Critics praised Big Time as a "fast-paced and thought-provoking speculative thriller with well-drawn and relatable characters" and "jaw-dropping plot twists."

Winters has been active in television since 2016, developing pilots and staffing on shows such as Legion and the Apple limited series Manhunt. In 2022 it was announced that Winters was creating a show based on the Jeffery Deaver novel The Never Game, later retitled Tracker for CBS. The procedural, starring Justin Hartley of This Is Us and directed by Ken Olin, was picked up to series and premiered after Super Bowl LVIII in February 2024.

== Personal life ==
Winters lives in Los Angeles with his wife and three children.

== Bibliography ==
=== Fiction ===
- Sense and Sensibility and Sea Monsters (2009)
- Android Karenina (2010)
- The Secret Life of Ms. Finkleman (2010)
- The Mystery of the Missing Everything (2011)
- Bedbugs (2011)
- The Last Policeman (2012)
- Countdown City (2013)
- World of Trouble (2014)
- Underground Airlines (2016)
- Golden State (2019)
- The Quiet Boy (2021)
- Big Time (2024)

=== Audio-only ===
- Q&A (Audible original) (2020)
- Inside Jobs: Tales From a Time of Quarantine (Audible original) (2020)
- Self Help (Audible original) (2022)
- Stranger (Audible original) (2023)
- Hitchhikers (Audible original) (2025)

=== Poetry ===
- Literally Disturbed: Tales to Keep You Up at Night (2013)
- Literally Disturbed #2: More Tales to Keep You Up at Night (2015)
- Romantically Disturbed: Love Poems to Rip Your Heart Out (2015)

=== Plays ===
- Slut (Off Broadway, 2005)
- Breaking Up is Hard to Do (premiere Capitol Rep, Albany, 2005; licensed by Theatrical Rights Worldwide)
- The Midnight Ride of Paul Revere (TheatreWorks USA, 2006); licensed by Samuel French
- A (Tooth) Fairy Tale (premiered by Vital Theater, 2009); licensed by Samuel French
- Uncle Pirate (premiered by Vital Theater, 2010); licensed by Samuel French

== Recognition ==
- 2008 Dramatists Guild Fellowship
- 2010 Edgar Award Nomination (The Secret Life of Ms. Finkleman)
- 2011 Bank Street Best Children's Book (The Secret Life of Ms. Finkleman)
- 2012 Edgar Award Winner (The Last Policeman)
- 2012 Macavity Award Nominee (The Last Policeman)
- 2013 Philip K. Dick Award Winner (Countdown City)
- 2014 Edgar Award Nominee (World of Trouble)
- 2015 Anthony Award Nominee (World of Trouble)
- 2017 Chautauqua Prize finalist (Underground Airlines)
- 2017 International Thriller Award nominee (Best Novel) (Underground Airlines)
- 2019 Grand prix de L'Imaginaire (Foreign-Language Novel) (Underground Airlines)
- 2020 Audie Award Nominee (Inside Jobs)
