= Soft science fiction =

Sub-genre of science fiction emphasizing "soft" sciences or human emotions

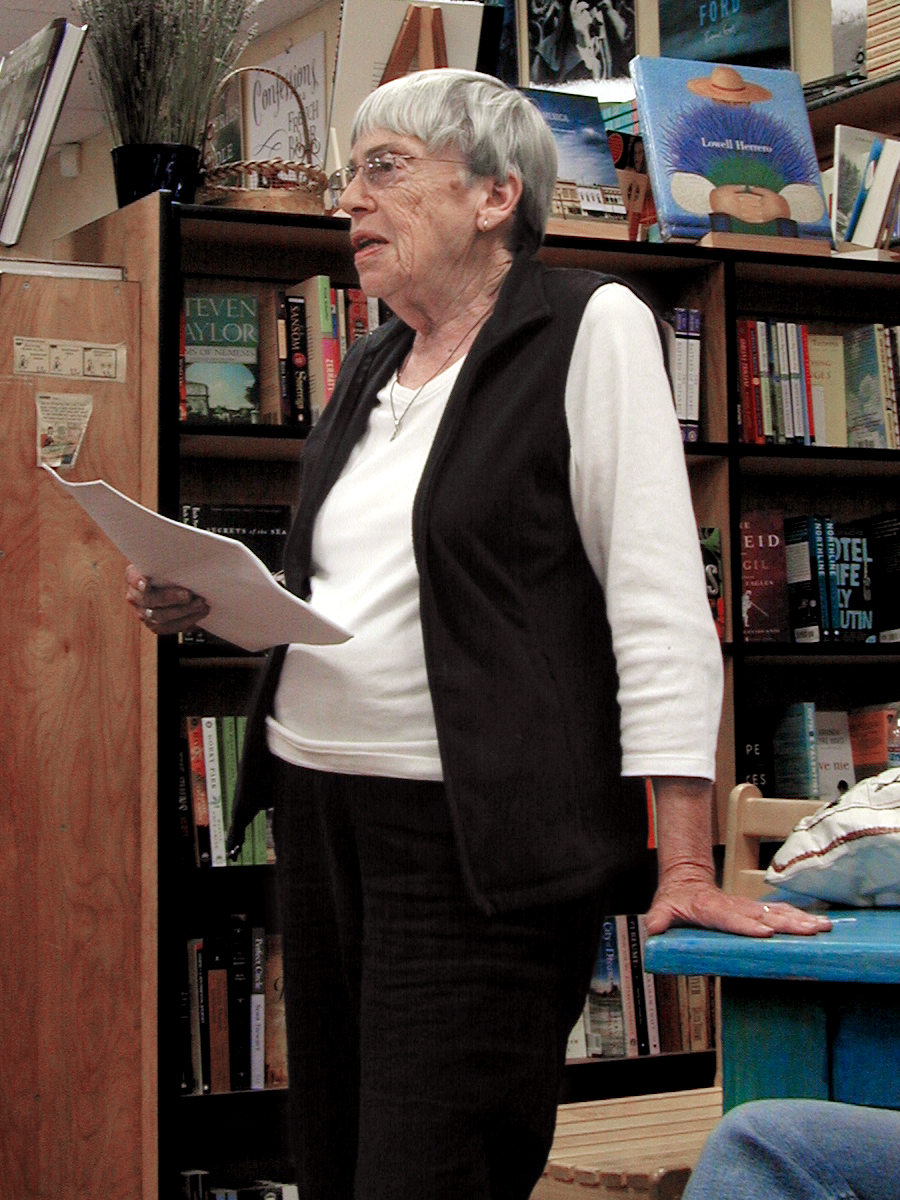
Ursula K. Le Guin, one of the most significant writers of soft science fiction

Soft science fiction, or soft SF, soft sci-fi, is a category of science fiction with two different definitions, in contrast to hard science fiction. It explores the "soft" sciences (e.g. psychology, political science, sociology), as opposed to the "hard" sciences (e.g. physics, astronomy, biology). It can also refer to science fiction which prioritizes human emotions over scientific accuracy or plausibility.

Soft science fiction of either type is often more concerned with depicting speculative societies and relationships between characters, rather than realistic portrayals of speculative science or engineering. The term first appeared in the late 1970s and is attributed to Australian literary scholar Peter Nicholls.

== Definition ==
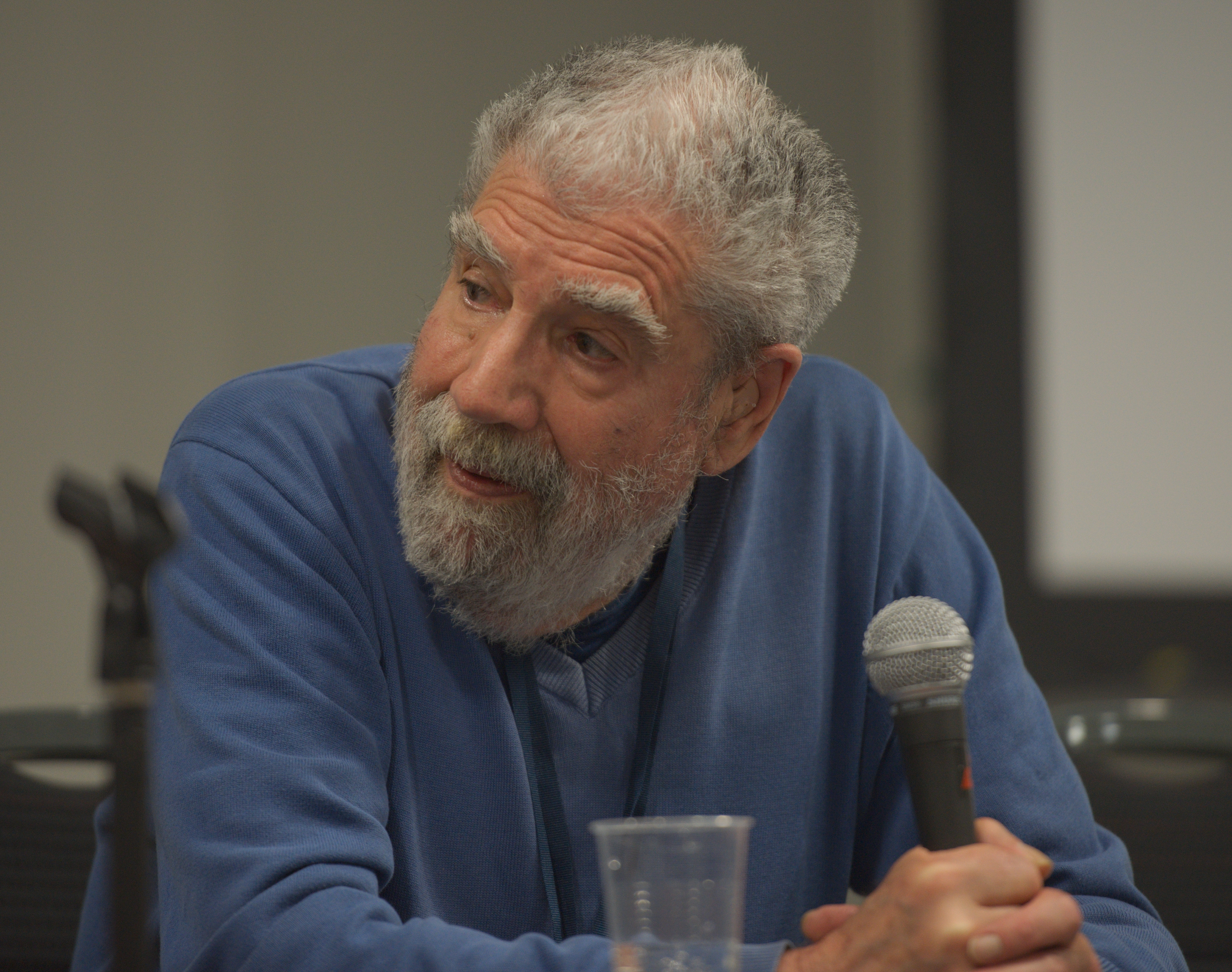
Peter Nicholls, the first person attested to have used the term soft science fiction

In The Encyclopedia of Science Fiction, Peter Nicholls writes that "soft SF" is a "not very precise item of SF terminology" and that the contrast between hard and soft is "sometimes illogical." In fact, the boundaries between "hard" and "soft" are neither definite nor universally agreed-upon, so there is no single standard of scientific "hardness" or "softness." Some readers might consider any deviation from the possible or probable (for example, including faster-than-light travel or paranormal powers) to be a mark of "softness." Others might see an emphasis on character or the social implications of technological change (however possible or probable) as a departure from the science-engineering-technology issues that in their view ought to be the focus of hard SF. Given this lack of objective and well-defined standards, "soft science fiction" does not indicate a genre or subgenre of SF but a tendency or quality—one pole of an axis that has "hard science fiction" at the other pole.

In Brave New Words, subtitled The Oxford Dictionary of Science Fiction, soft science fiction is given two definitions. The first definition is fiction that is primarily focused on advancements in, or extrapolations of, the soft sciences; that is social sciences and not natural sciences. The second definition is science fiction in which science is not important to the story.

== Etymology ==
The term soft science fiction was formed as the complement of the earlier term hard science fiction.

The earliest known citation for the term is in "1975: The Year in Science Fiction" by Peter Nicholls, in Nebula Award Stories 11 (1976). He wrote "The same list reveals that an already established shift from hard sf (chemistry, physics, astronomy, technology) to soft sf (psychology, biology, anthropology, sociology, and even [...] linguistics) is continuing more strongly than ever."

== History ==
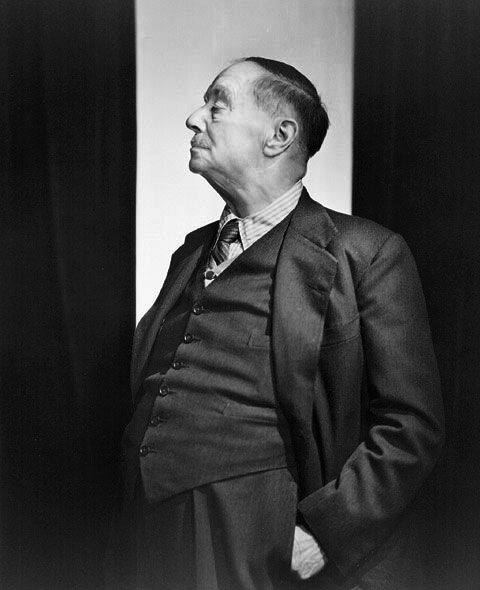
H. G. Wells, an early example of a soft science fiction writer

Poul Anderson, in Ideas for SF Writers (Sep 1998), described H. G. Wells as the model for soft science fiction: "He concentrated on the characters, their emotions and interactions" rather than any of the science or technology behind, for example, invisible men or time machines. Jeffrey Wallmann suggests that soft science fiction grew out of the gothic fiction of Edgar Allan Poe and Mary Shelley.

Carol McGuirk, in Fiction 2000 (1992), states that the "soft school" of science fiction dominated the genre in the 1950s, with the beginning of the Cold War and an influx of new readers into the science fiction genre. The early members of the soft science fiction genre were Alfred Bester, Fritz Leiber, Ray Bradbury, and James Blish, who were the first to make a "radical" break from the hard science fiction tradition and "take extrapolation explicitly inward", emphasising the characters and their characterisation. In calling out specific examples from this period, McGuirk describes Ursula K. Le Guin's 1969 novel The Left Hand of Darkness as "a soft SF classic". The New Wave movement in science fiction developed out of soft science fiction in the 1960s and 70s. The conte cruel was the standard narrative form of soft science fiction by the 1980s. During the 1980s cyberpunk developed from soft science fiction.

McGuirk identifies two subgenres of soft science fiction: "Humanist science fiction" (in which human beings, rather than technology, are the cause of advancement or from which change can be extrapolated in the setting; often involving speculation on the human condition) and "Science fiction noir" (focusing on the negative aspects of human nature; often in a dystopian setting).

== Examples ==
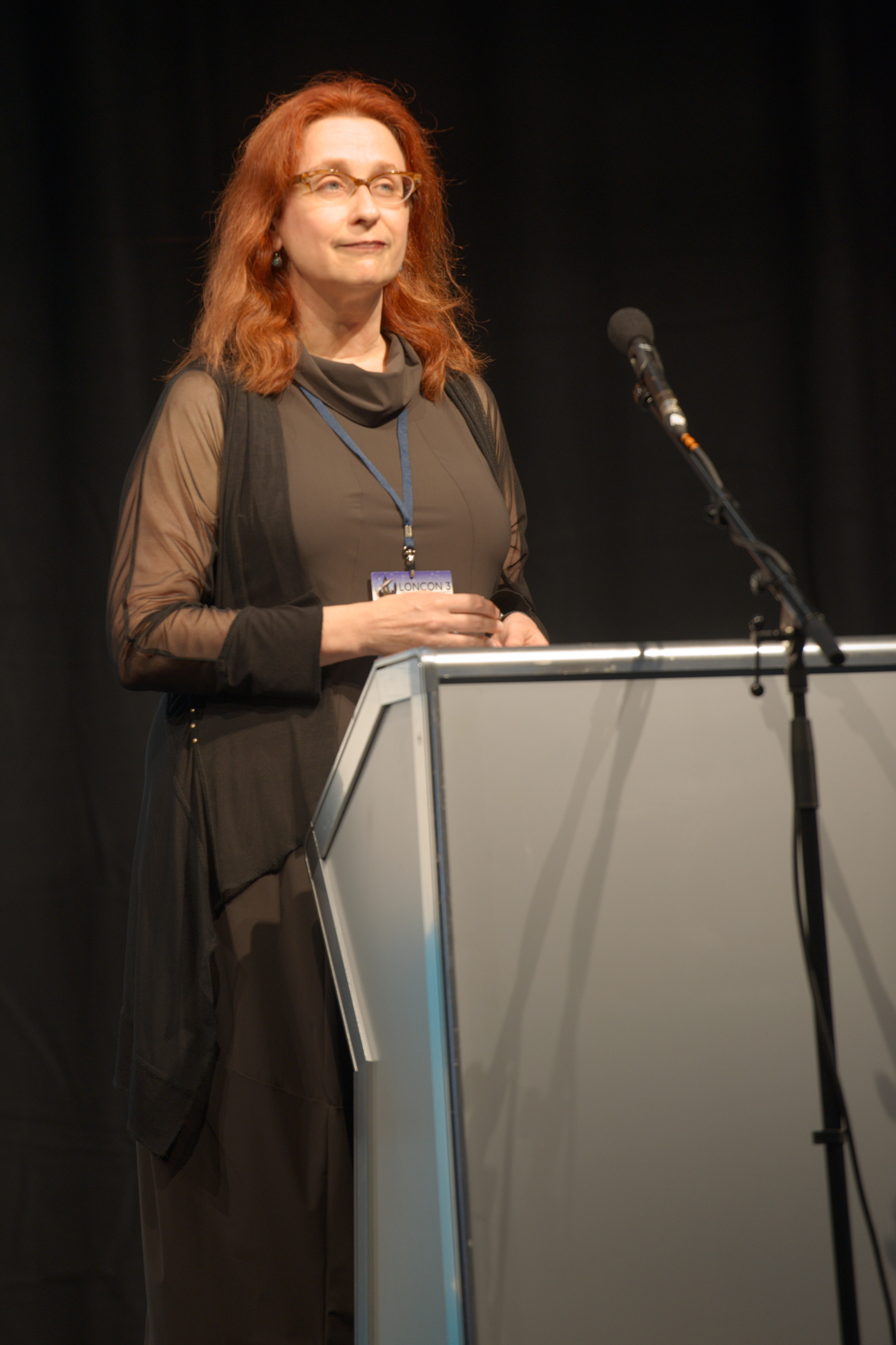
Audrey Niffenegger, author of the soft science fiction work The Time Traveler's Wife

George Orwell's Nineteen Eighty-Four might be described as soft science fiction, since it is concerned primarily with how society and interpersonal relationships are altered by a political force that uses technology mercilessly; even though it is the source of many ideas and tropes commonly explored in subsequent science fiction, (even in hard science fiction), such as mind control and surveillance. And yet, its style is uncompromisingly realistic, and despite its then-future setting, very much more like a spy novel or political thriller in terms of its themes and treatment.

Karel Čapek's 1920 play R.U.R., which supplied the term robot (nearly replacing earlier terms such as automaton) and features a trope-defining climax in which artificial workers unite to overthrow human society, covers such issues as free will, a post-scarcity economy, robot rebellion, and post-apocalyptic culture. The play, subtitled "A Fantastic Melodrama", offers only a general description of the process for creating living workers out of artificial tissue, and thus can be compared to social comedy or literary fantasy.

George S. Elrick, in Science Fiction Handbook for Readers and Writers (1978), cited Brian Aldiss' 1959 short story collection The Canopy of Time (using the US title Galaxies Like Grains of Sand) as an example of soft science fiction based on the soft sciences.

Frank Herbert's Dune series is a landmark of soft science fiction. In it, he deliberately spent little time on the details of its futuristic technology so he could devote it chiefly to addressing the politics of humanity, rather than the future of humanity's technology.

Linguistic relativity (also known as the Sapir–Whorf hypothesis), the theory that language influences thought and perception, is a subject explored in some soft science fiction works such as Jack Vance's The Languages of Pao (1958) and Samuel R. Delany's Babel-17 (1966). In these works artificial languages are used to control and change people and whole societies. Science fictional linguistics are also the subject of varied works from Ursula K. Le Guin's novel The Dispossessed (1974), to the Star Trek: The Next Generation episode "Darmok" (1991), to Neal Stephenson's novel Snow Crash (1992), C.J. Cherryh's Foreigner books (1994– ), to the film Arrival (2016).

=== Films set in outer space ===
Soft science fiction filmmakers tend to extend to outer space certain physics that are associated with life on Earth's surface, primarily to make scenes more spectacular or recognizable to the audience. Examples of these artistic liberties are:

- Presence of gravity without use of an artificial gravity system.
- Radio communication without any speed-of-light time lag.
- A spaceship's engines or an explosion generating sound despite the vacuum of space.
- Spaceships changing directions without any visible thrusting activity.
- Spaceship occupants enduring without any visible effort the enormous g-forces generated from a spaceship's extreme maneuvering (e.g. in a dogfight situation) or launch.
- Astronauts instantly freezing to death or getting a frostbite when exposed to outer space
- Spacecraft which suffer engine failures "falling" or coming to a stop, instead of continuing along their current trajectory or orbit as per inertia.

Hard science fiction films try to avoid such artistic license.

== Representative works ==
Arranged chronologically by publication year.

=== Short fiction ===
- H. G. Wells, The Time Machine (1895) and The Invisible Man (1897)
- Miles J. Breuer, "The Gostak and the Doshes" (1930)
- Ray Bradbury, The Martian Chronicles (1950, short story collection)
- James Blish, "Surface Tension" (1952) (Note: The short story "Surface Tension" has also been described as an exemplar of hard science fiction. (Hartwell, David G.; Cramer, Kathryn, eds. (1994). The Ascent of Wonder: The Evolution of Hard SF. New York: Tom Doherty Associates, Inc. ISBN 9780312855093.))
- Murray Leinster, "Exploration Team" (1956)
- Brian Aldiss, The Canopy of Time (1959, short story collection)
- Daniel Keyes, "Flowers for Algernon" (1959)
- Sakyo Komatsu, "Shigatsu Juyokkakan" (1974)

=== Novels ===
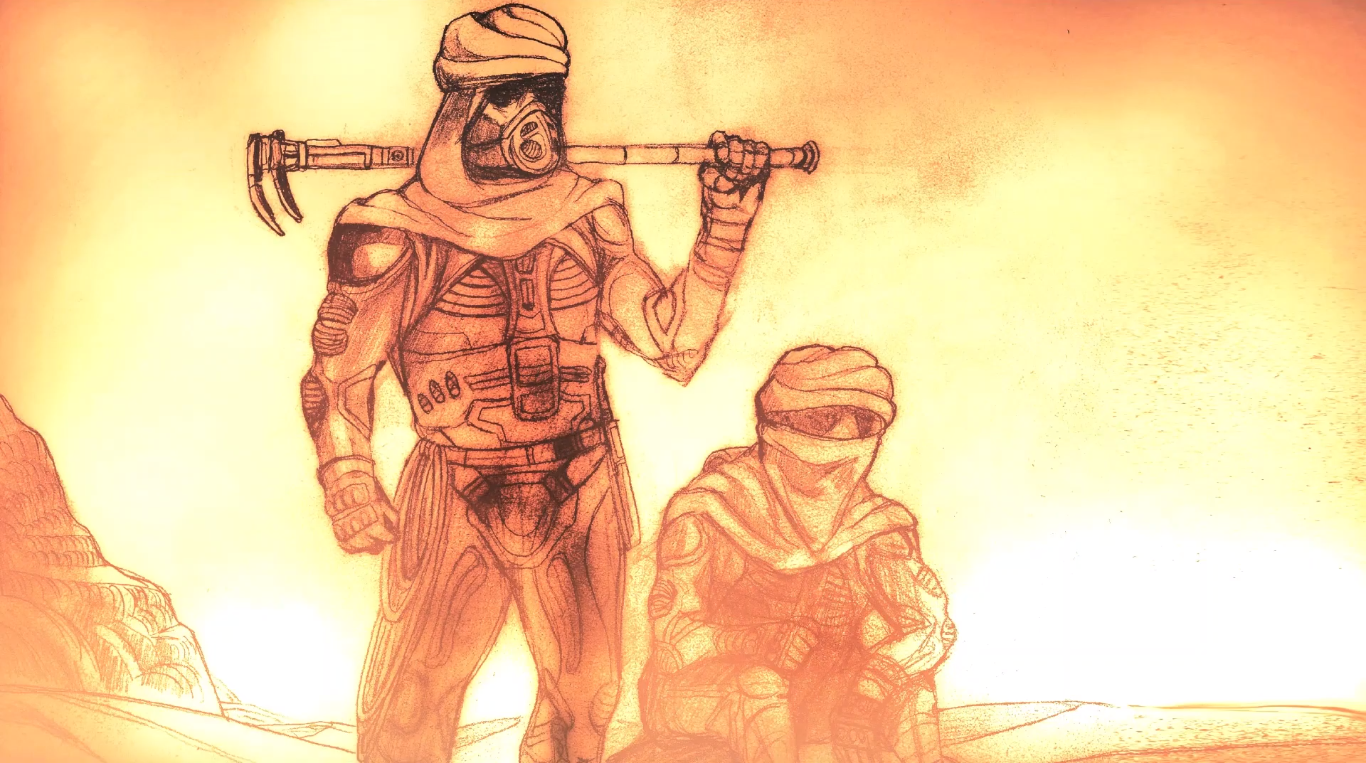
Fan art of the Fremen, a fictional group of people from the novel Dune by Frank Herbert

- Mary Shelley, Frankenstein (1818)
- Alfred Bester, The Demolished Man (1953)
- Ray Bradbury, Fahrenheit 451 (1953)
- Ted Sturgeon, More Than Human (1953)
- Jack Vance, The Languages of Pao (1958)
- Philip K. Dick, Time Out of Joint (1959) and Ubik (1969)
- Walter M. Miller, Jr., A Canticle for Leibowitz (1960)
- Robert A. Heinlein, Stranger in a Strange Land (1961)
- Pierre Boulle, Monkey Planet (1963)
- Frank Herbert, Dune (1965)
- Samuel R. Delany, Babel-17 (1966)
- Ursula K. Le Guin, The Left Hand of Darkness (1969) and The Dispossessed (1974)
- Robert Silverberg, Dying Inside (1972)
- Frederik Pohl, Man Plus (1976)
- Michael Swanwick, In the Drift (1984)
- Kim Stanley Robinson, The Wild Shore (1984), (Book 1 of the Three Californias Trilogy)
- Storm Constantine, The Wraeththu Chronicles (1987)
- David Brin, The Postman (1985)
- Audrey Niffenegger, The Time Traveler's Wife (2003)
- Ben H. Winters, The Last Policeman (2012)

=== Film and television ===
In the sense of a basis in the soft sciences:

- Only certain episodes of Star Trek: The Next Generation (1987–1994) like the fifth season's "Darmok" (S5E02; September 30, 1991) are based on soft science concepts; in this case, linguistics.

Some prime examples of soft science fiction on film and television include:

- The Stargate franchise
- The Star Wars franchise
- The Farscape franchise
- The Planet of the Apes franchise
- The Transformers franchise
- The Terminator franchise
- Frank Herbert's Dune and its direct sequel Frank Herbert's Children of Dune
- The Firefly franchise
- Spaceballs

== See also ==
- Social science fiction
- Definitions of science fiction
- Outline of science fiction
- Time travel in fiction
- Hard and soft magic systems
