= Quirk Books =

American independent book publisher

- Founded: 2002; 24 years ago
- Founder: David Borgenicht
- Country of origin: United States
- Headquarters location: Philadelphia, Pennsylvania
- Distribution: Penguin Random House Publisher Services
- Publication types: Books
- Official website: www.quirkbooks.com

Quirk Books is an imprint of Andrews McMeel Publishing based in Philadelphia. Prior to their acquisition by Andrews McMeel in October 2025, Quirk Books was an independent book publisher.

== History ==
Before 2002, Quirk Books was a creative studio that would pitch novel ideas to other publishers. Quirk Books was founded as a publishing company in 2002 by David Borgenicht, co-author of The Worst-Case Scenario Survival Handbook. During its first years of operation, Quirk Books mainly targeted the gift book category. Quirk Books would publish one-note joke books, but this genre was eroded with the arrival of humor blogs. Jason Rekulak, who is credited for being the house's publisher who developed the mash-up novel style that makes the singularity of the company, got the idea of digging into public domain classics and mash them with fiction or horror features.

The release of Pride and Prejudice and Zombies (Seth Grahame-Smith, 2009) was the publisher's first venture into the novel mashup genre. The original idea was developed by Rekulak and assigned to Grahame-Smith with a $5,000 advance. It made The New York Times bestseller list for more than 50 weeks, which led the publishing company to commission more. In 2013, Quirk Books launched the William Shakespeare's Star Wars series (Ian Doescher, 2013). Miss Peregrine’s Home for Peculiar Children sold more than 9 million copies and spent more than 108 consecutive weeks on the New York Times Bestseller List for Young Adult fiction.

In May 2018, Quirk Books moved into the graphic novel arena with the release of Manfried the Man (Caitlin Major, Kelly Bastow), followed by the release of Giraffes on Horseback Salad (Josh Frank, Manuela Pertega) based on an original story by Salvador Dalí.

Quirk Books has also licensing agreements with the production companies' 20th Century Fox and Universal to make children's books out of the movies Home Alone and Back to the Future.

In April 2021, after a 20-year career, Brett Cohen resigned as president and publisher of Quirk Books. David Borgenicht took back the role of president, and Jhanteigh Kupihea was named publisher. The whole management team was reshuffled.

In June 2025, Quirk owner David Borgenicht paused the publishing program, laying off seven members of the recently formed union out of a total of approximately 20 staff members. The layoff included the entire editorial team. He denied that this action was in retaliation, citing the timing of the layoffs, which came days after Quirk Books management voluntarily recognized the union, as "unfortunate coincidences." The previous month, the NewsGuild of Greater Philadelphia had filed an unfair labor practice charge against the company. The allegations included "Coercive Actions (Surveillance, etc)" and "Coercive Statements (Threats, Promises of Benefits, etc)".

In October 2025, it was announced that Andrews McMeel Publishing had acquired Quirk Books. As a result, Quirk Books Union's dissolved; in an October 2025 post on Instagram, the Union wrote, "the positions of all the remaining union members have been eliminated . . . Given the acquisition of the company and the layoffs, Quirk Books Union will no longer exist."

== Publications ==
Pride and Prejudice and Zombies currently has more than one million copies in print and has been translated into 25 languages. Ben H. Winters's Sense and Sensibility and Sea Monsters, the follow-up title to Pride and Prejudice and Zombies, became a New York Times bestseller in September 2009. The 2010 prequel to Pride and Prejudice and Zombies, Steve Hockensmith's Pride and Prejudice and Zombies: Dawn of the Dreadfuls, was also a New York Times bestseller.

As of 2020, Ransom Riggs's Miss Peregrine’s Home for Peculiar Children (2011) has spent more than 108 consecutive weeks on the New York Times Bestseller List for Young Adult fiction. In January 2014, Quirk released the sequel, Hollow City: The Second Novel of Miss Peregrine’s Peculiar Children, followed by the third book, Library of Souls: The Third Novel of Miss Peregrine's Peculiar Children in September 2015 and the latest installment The Conference of the Birds: Miss Peregrine's Peculiar Children in January 2020.
