= Mashup novel =

Non-canonical parody without continuity with the original

A mashup novel (or mash-up novel or mashed-up novel, or simply mashup) is an unauthorised non-canonical work of fiction, often parodical, which combines a well-known pre-existing literature text with another genre. The term was popularized in reference to horror writer Seth Grahame-Smith and his work on the classical novels of Jane Austen.

== Characteristics ==
Marjorie Kehe of The Christian Science Monitor renders this admixture of classic text as "somewhere between 60 and 85 percent original text, with new plot twists added by contemporary co-authors". These "twists" often include horror fiction elements like vampires, werewolves or zombies.

While most works in mash-up genre rely on fictional texts as their basis, other works like Abraham Lincoln, Vampire Hunter or Queen Victoria: Demon Hunter superimpose the same sort of contrasting genre upon historical figures and events. A more recent phenomenon within the genre is the combination of more than two original works, or genres, as in the case of Robinson Crusoe (The Eerie Adventures of the Lycanthrope), which combines the original novel with elements borrowed from the works of H. P. Lovecraft as well as the popular genre of werewolf fiction; accordingly, the work was attributed to three authors: Daniel Defoe, H. P. Lovecraft and Peter Clines.

== History ==
The term mashup or mash-up originated within the music industry. Also called "mash-up", songs within the genre are described as a song or composition created by blending two or more pre-recorded songs, usually by overlaying the vocal track of one song seamlessly over the instrumental track of another. To the extent that such works are "transformative" of original content, they may find protection from copyright claims under the "fair use" doctrine of copyright law. Adam Cohen of The New York Times notes that even before that, "the idea of combining two data sources into a new product began in the tech world" before spreading to other media, including book publishing.

One of the term's first appearances is in a review of Seth Grahame-Smith's 2009 novel Pride and Prejudice and Zombies. Initially calling it a "parody" and "literary hybrid", Caroline Kellogg, lead blogger for Jacket Copy, The LA Times' book blog, later describes the work as "novel-as-mashup". As the popularity of the novel grew and a bidding war commenced over the film rights to the book, the term spread. Subsequent works on classical literature include Sense and Sensibility and Sea Monsters and Little Women and Werewolves.

Prior to publication, the artwork cover for Pride and Prejudice and Zombies depicting a "zombified" Regency portrait of Marcia Fox by Sir William Beechey altered by Quirk Books artist Eric "Doogie" Horner to show her lower face eroded, exposing bone and viscera caught the attention of bloggers, as did the opening line of the novel: "It is a truth universally acknowledged that a zombie in possession of brains must be in want of more brains". This is a parody of Austen's original line, "It is a truth universally acknowledged that a single man, in possession of a good fortune, must be in want of a wife".

== Exemplars ==
The novel Pride and Prejudice and Zombies combines Jane Austen's classic 1813 novel Pride and Prejudice with elements of modern zombie fiction, crediting Austen as co-author. It was first published in April 2009 by Quirk Books and in October 2009 a Deluxe Edition was released, containing full-color images and additional zombie scenes.

An earlier novel, Move Under Ground by Nick Mamatas, was a 2004 novel combining the Beat style of Jack Kerouac with the cosmic horror of H. P. Lovecraft's Cthulhu Mythos.

== Copyright issues ==
Mashup novels constitute derivative works since they include major elements borrowed from an original, previously created work. Most authors of such novels, however, avoid potential legal issues (and the payment of royalties to the original writers) by basing their books on texts that are in the public domain.

== Reception ==
While the genre was initially well-received (Pride and Prejudice and Zombies spent eight months on the New York Times Best Seller list and Abraham Lincoln: Vampire Hunter has already been made into a feature film), at least one reviewer has suggested that it has run its course in popularity. Jennifer Schuessler, of The New York Times, reflects the pessimism of critics of the genre:

Publishers in search of a marketing hook aren't above trumpeting even their most middling wares as a mix of Dickens, Chekhov and Dan Brown. This year, a small publishing house in Philadelphia hit on a more effective formula: Take some Jane Austen, add a healthy dollop of gore and start counting the money.

== Examples ==
- Abraham Lincoln, Vampire Hunter
- Android Karenina
- The Book of Renfield
- The Book of Joan by Lidia Yuknavitch
- Move Under Ground
- Pride and Prejudice and Zombies
- Pride and Prejudice and Zombies: Dawn of the Dreadfuls
- Queen Victoria: Demon Hunter
- Sense and Sensibility and Sea Monsters
- The Great Gatsby and the Zombies

== See also ==
- Cheshire Crossing
- Copyright protection for fictional characters
- Continuation novel
- Cross-licensing
- Crossover (fiction) – authorised, sometimes canonical, mixing of characters or worlds from originally separate fictional universes for new story.
  - Intercompany crossovers in comics
- Klinger v. Conan Doyle Estate, Ltd.
- Parallel novel – non-canonical expansions within the fictional universe.
- Pastiche
- The Adventures of Tintin: Breaking Free
- The Lunar Chronicles
