= Abraham Lincoln: Vampire Hunter =

2012 film by Timur Bekmambetov

- Theatrical release poster
- Directed by: Timur Bekmambetov
- Screenplay by: Seth Grahame-Smith (Note: Simon Kinberg was credited for screenplay with Grahame-Smith, but later went uncredited, only serving as an executive producer.)
- Based on: Abraham Lincoln: Vampire Hunter; 2010 novel by Seth Grahame-Smith
- Produced by: Tim Burton; Jim Lemley; Timur Bekmambetov
- Starring: Benjamin Walker; Dominic Cooper; Anthony Mackie; Mary Elizabeth Winstead; Rufus Sewell; Marton Csokas
- Cinematography: Caleb Deschanel
- Edited by: William Hoy
- Music by: Henry Jackman
- Production companies: Bazelevs Company; Dune Entertainment; Tim Burton Productions
- Distributed by: 20th Century Fox
- Release dates: June 18, 2012 (New York City); June 22, 2012 (United States)
- Running time: 105 minutes
- Country: United States
- Language: English
- Budget: $69–99.5 million
- Box office: $116.4 million

Abraham Lincoln: Vampire Hunter is a 2012 American horror film directed by Timur Bekmambetov, produced by Bekmambetov, Tim Burton, and Jim Lemley, and written by Seth Grahame-Smith, who also serves as an executive producer alongside Simon Kinberg, Michele Wolkoff, and John J. Kelly. It is based on the novel of the same name by Grahame-Smith, depicting a fictionalized history of the American Civil War with the eponymous 16th president of the United States reimagined as having a secret identity as a lifelong vampire hunter fighting against a caste of vampiric slave owners. Benjamin Walker stars as Abraham Lincoln with supporting roles by Dominic Cooper, Anthony Mackie, Mary Elizabeth Winstead, Rufus Sewell, and Marton Csokas.

Filming began in Louisiana in March 2011, and Henry Jackman was hired to compose the film's score. Produced by Bazelevs Company, Dune Entertainment, and Tim Burton Productions, the film was released on June 20, 2012, in the United Kingdom and then two days later in the United States, by 20th Century Fox. The film received mixed reviews; critics praised the visual style but criticized the overly serious and inconsistent tone. The film also failed to meet expectations at the box office, grossing $116 million worldwide against a budget of $69-$99 million.

== Plot ==
In 1818, Abraham Lincoln lives in Indiana with parents Nancy and Thomas, who work at a plantation owned by Jack Barts. There, Lincoln befriends a young African-American boy, William Johnson, and intervenes when Johnson is beaten by a slaver. Because of this, the Lincolns are fired. That night, Lincoln sees Barts break into their home and attack Nancy, who falls ill and dies the next day.

Nine years later, Lincoln attempts to kill Barts at the docks in revenge but discovers that he is a vampire. Before Barts can kill him, Lincoln is rescued by Henry Sturges, whom he had met earlier at a bar. Sturges offers to teach Lincoln how to be a vampire hunter using his preferred weapon of a single-edged felling axe, and he accepts. After a decade of training, they travel to Springfield, Illinois. Sturges explains that the vampires in the United States descend from Adam, a powerful vampire who owns a plantation in New Orleans with his sister, Vadoma. Sturges reveals the vampires' weakness is silver and presents him with a silver pocket watch.

In Springfield, Lincoln begins hunting vampires named in letters by Sturges, befriends shopkeeper Joshua Speed and meets Mary Todd. Though Sturges warns him of forming close relationships lest his loved ones are attacked by vampires, Lincoln develops romantic feelings for Mary. Later, Lincoln successfully finds and kills Barts, but not before learning Sturges is also a vampire. Lincoln confronts Sturges, who reveals that Adam turned him and killed his wife, as his soul was impure, and hers was not. Vampires cannot kill each other, so Sturges needs hunters like Lincoln to get his revenge.

Feeling betrayed, Lincoln abandons his mission, but his actions have been noticed by Adam, who lures Lincoln to his plantation in the South by kidnapping Johnson. In the mansion, Adam hosts a ball that turns into a feeding frenzy where the vampires attack the slaves. Lincoln watches from outside and then breaks in to save the day, but he is captured by the vampires. Adam tries to recruit him to his cause to turn America into a nation of the undead, but Lincoln refuses before the two are rescued by Speed. They find safe passage to the North with the help of Harriet Tubman.

Lincoln marries Mary Todd and begins his political career, campaigning to abolish slavery, despite Sturges warning him that the slave trade keeps vampires under control due to being their food source. After Lincoln's election as President of the United States of America, he moves to the White House with Mary, where they have a son, William Wallace Lincoln, who is later bitten by Vadoma as retaliation and dies.

The civil war erupts; after Confederate President Jefferson Davis convinces Adam to deploy his vampires to the front lines, Lincoln orders the confiscation of all available silver to be melted and cast into silver weapons. Speed seemingly betrays Lincoln by informing Adam about the train transporting these weapons, which Adam then attacks after setting fire to an upcoming trestle. During the fight, Speed is killed, and Adam learns that the train holds only rocks, revealing Speed's betrayal was a ruse to lure Adam into a trap. Lincoln uses his watch to punch Adam, killing him, before escaping with Sturges and Johnson as the burning trestle beneath the train collapses.

Meanwhile, Mary, Harriet Tubman, and many freedom seekers transport the silver to Gettysburg through the Underground Railroad. While delivering the silver to the army, Mary recognizes Vadoma and kills her by shooting a silver necklace bearing the sword of one of William's toy soldiers. Armed with silver weapons, the Union soldiers destroy the vampires and turn the tide.

Nearly two years later, on April 14, 1865, Lincoln celebrates the end of the war. Sturges informs him that the remaining vampires have fled the country and tries to convince Lincoln to become a vampire, who declines before leaving with Mary for a play. In modern times, Sturges approaches a man at a bar in Washington, D.C., just as he once did with Abraham.

== Cast ==
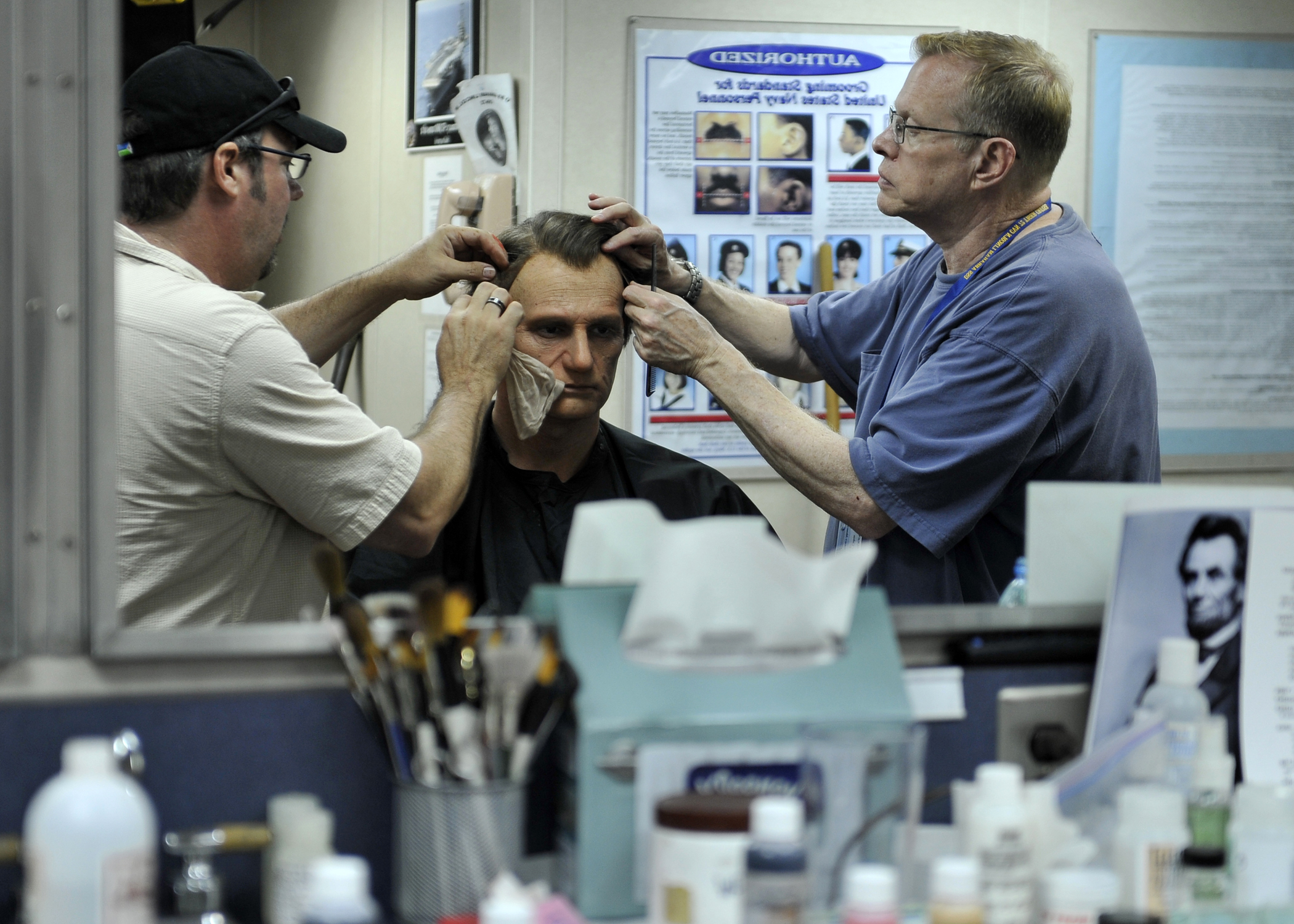
Benjamin Walker, who plays the titular role in this film, gets into character before touring the USS Abraham Lincoln.

- Benjamin Walker as Abraham Lincoln, a secret vampire hunter, who serves as the 16th President of the United States.
  - Lux Haney-Jardine as Young Abraham Lincoln
- Dominic Cooper as Henry Sturges, Lincoln's mentor in vampire hunting, a former vampire hunter, and a vampire who lost his wife and humanity to vampires.
- Anthony Mackie as Will Johnson, Lincoln's earliest and closest friend.
  - Curtis Harris as Young Will
- Mary Elizabeth Winstead as Mary Todd Lincoln, Lincoln's wife.
- Rufus Sewell as Adam, the 5,000-year-old leader of an order of vampires.
- Marton Csokas as Jack Barts, a plantation owner and the vampire who killed Lincoln's mother.
- Jimmi Simpson as Joshua Speed, Lincoln's friend and assistant.
- Joseph Mawle as Thomas Lincoln, Lincoln's father.
- Robin McLeavy as Nancy Lincoln, Lincoln's mother.
- Erin Wasson as Vadoma, Adam's sister.
- John Rothman as Jefferson Davis
- Cameron M. Brown as William Wallace Lincoln, Abraham and Mary's third son.
- Frank Brennan as Senator Jeb Nolan
- Jaqueline Fleming as Harriet Tubman
- Alan Tudyk as Stephen A. Douglas, an American politician from Illinois.

== Production ==
The film Abraham Lincoln: Vampire Hunter was first announced in March 2010 when Tim Burton and Timur Bekmambetov paired to purchase film rights and to finance its development themselves. The book's author, Seth Grahame-Smith, was hired to write the script. 20th Century Fox beat other studios in a bidding war for rights to the film the following October.

In January 2011, with Bekmambetov attached as director, Benjamin Walker was cast as Abraham Lincoln. He beat Adrien Brody, Josh Lucas, James D'Arcy, and Oliver Jackson-Cohen for the role. Additional actors were cast in the following February. Filming began in March 2011 in Louisiana. The film had a budget of $99.5 million and was produced in 3D.

== Release ==
Abraham Lincoln: Vampire Hunter was originally scheduled to be released in 2D and 3D on October 28, 2011, but the release date was later pushed back to June 22, 2012. The movie premiered in New York City on June 18. Abraham Lincoln: Vampire Hunter also made an unconventional debut with a screening for troops deployed in the Middle East. The movie was screened to over 1,800 sailors aboard the Navy aircraft carrier USS Abraham Lincoln, just before its Refueling and Complex Overhaul (RCOH) at Newport News, Virginia. Several of the film's stars attended the screening, including Anthony Mackie, Erin Wasson and Benjamin Walker, who dressed in character as Abraham Lincoln. The screening marks the first time that a major motion picture made its debut for United States servicemembers.

== Reception ==
=== Critical response ===
On Rotten Tomatoes the film has an approval rating of 34%, based on 193 reviews with an average score of 5.0/10. The consensus reads that the film "has visual style to spare, but its overly serious tone doesn't jibe with its decidedly silly central premise, leaving filmgoers with an unfulfilling blend of clashing ingredients." Emanuel Levy of EmanuelLevy.com wrote that "Though original, this is a strenuous effort to combine the conventions of two genres." On Metacritic it has a "mixed or average" score of 42 out of 100, based on 35 reviews. Audiences polled by CinemaScore gave the film an average grade of "C+" on an A+ to F scale.

Richard Corliss of Time magazine stated that "The historical epic and the monster movie run on parallel tracks, occasionally colliding but never forming a coherent whole." Christy Lemire of Associated Press meanwhile, commented on the film's tenor and visual effects, saying "What ideally might have been playful and knowing is instead uptight and dreary, with a visual scheme that's so fake and cartoony, it depletes the film of any sense of danger," awarding the film a rating of 1.5 out of 4. Joe Morgenstern of The Wall Street Journal agreed, writing, "Someone forgot to tell the filmmakers ... that the movie was supposed to be fun. Or at least smart."

Joe Neumaier of New York Daily News gave the film a rating of 1 out of 5, writing, "This insipid mashup of history lesson and monster flick takes itself semi-seriously, which is truly deadly." The title was praised by Manohla Dargis of The New York Times, who added, "it's too bad someone had to spoil things by making a movie to go with it."

Positive response, meanwhile, came from Marc Savlov of the Austin Chronicle, "Abraham Lincoln: Vampire Hunter has heart to spare, and the occasional silvered bayonet to run it through." USA Today reviewer Scott Bowles remarked, "A stylish slasher of a movie, a monster flick that does its vampires right, if not their real-life counterparts," giving the film 2.5 out of 4. Further acclaim came from Joe Williams of St. Louis Post-Dispatch, who called it "the best action movie of the summer", praised the film for presenting "a surprisingly respectful tone toward American values and their most heroic proponent", calling "the battlefield scenes [...] suitably epic" and commended leading star Benjamin Walker, "a towering actor who looks like a young Liam Neeson and never stoops to caricature."

=== Box office ===
Abraham Lincoln: Vampire Hunter grossed $37,519,139 at the domestic box office and $78,952,441 in international markets. It received a worldwide total of $116,471,580. On its opening domestic weekend, it grossed $16.3 million from 3,108 theaters. In its second domestic weekend, it suffered a 63.1% drop, while gaining one theater. On its third weekend, it lost nearly half of its theater count, and another 67.6% in gross.

=== Accolades ===
Year	Award	Category	Recipients	Result	Ref.
2013	Young Artist Award	Best Performance in a Feature Film – Supporting Young Actor Ten and Under	Cameron M. Brown	Nominated	

== Home media ==
Abraham Lincoln: Vampire Hunter was released on DVD, Blu-ray and Blu-ray 3D in the United States and Canada on October 23, 2012.

== Soundtrack ==
The soundtrack to Abraham Lincoln: Vampire Hunter as composed by Henry Jackman was released digitally on June 12, 2012, and set to be released physically on July 3, 2012. In addition, Linkin Park's song "Powerless", from their 2012 album Living Things premiered in the official trailer to Abraham Lincoln and was the first song to be played over the closing credits, followed by "The Rampant Hunter". However, the song was not featured in the soundtrack, but still the song was released as a single under the name of soundtrack in Japan.

No.	Title	Length
1.	"Childhood Tragedy"	0:54
2.	"Vampires"	3:06
3.	"What Do You Hate?"	1:15
4.	"Power Comes from Truth"	2:29
5.	"You Are Full of Surprises"	1:15
6.	"Mary Todd"	1:56
7.	"The Horse Stampede"	3:15
8.	"Henry Sturges"	0:55
9.	"Adam"	1:28
10.	"Rescue Mission"	1:15
11.	"Inauguration"	1:52
12.	"All Slave to Something"	2:49
13.	"Emancipation"	0:45
14.	"Haunted by the Past"	3:00
15.	"Battle at Gettysburg"	0:49
16.	"Forging Silver"	1:40
17.	"80 Miles"	1:52
18.	"The Burning Bridge"	3:41
19.	"Not the Only Railroad"	1:38
20.	"The Gettysburg Address"	2:22
21.	"Late to the Theater"	2:00
22.	"The Rampant Hunter" (iTunes exclusive)	5:30
Total length:		45:32

Promotional single
No.	Title	Artist	Length
23.	"Powerless"	Linkin Park	3:44

== See also ==
- Cultural depictions of Abraham Lincoln
- Abraham Lincoln vs. Zombies, a mockbuster of this film
- Hansel & Gretel: Witch Hunters, a film with a very similar theme – and its mockbuster Hansel & Gretel
- Jesus Christ Vampire Hunter, a cult film about Jesus Christ's life as a vampire hunter
- Queen Victoria: Demon Hunter
- The Amazing Screw-On Head, a comic book and cartoon involving Abraham Lincoln and vampires
- Lincoln, a historical biographical film released in the same year about Abraham Lincoln
- Vampire film
