= First inauguration of Abraham Lincoln =

19th United States presidential inauguration

First presidential inauguration of Abraham Lincoln
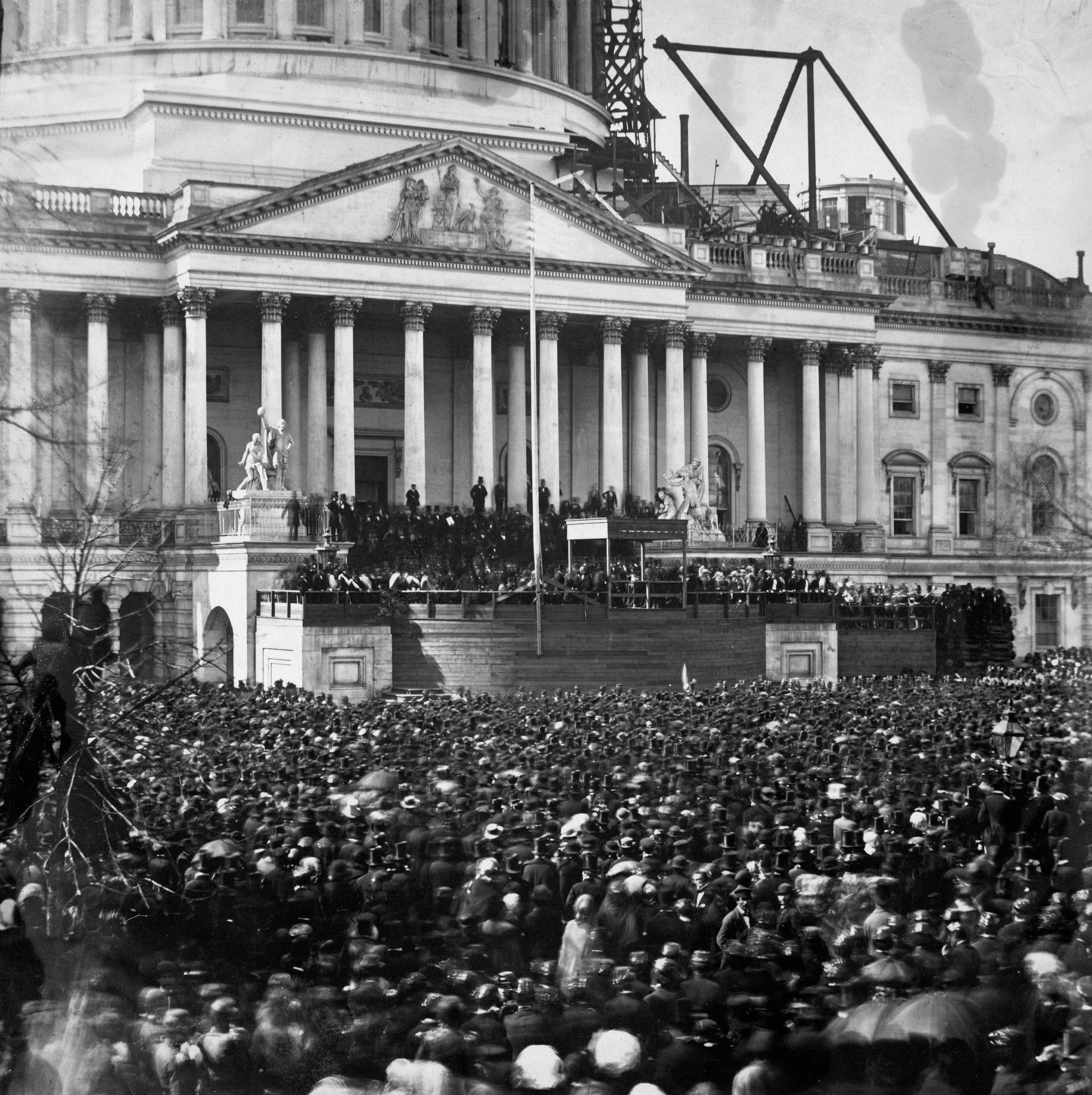
- Lincoln swearing-in at the partly finished Capitol building
- Date: March 2, 1861; 165 years ago (Hamlin); March 4, 1861 (Lincoln)
- Location: United States Capitol, Washington, D.C.
- Participants: Abraham Lincoln; 16th president of the United States — Assuming office Roger B. Taney; Chief Justice of the United States — Administering oath Hannibal Hamlin; 15th vice president of the United States — Assuming office John C. Breckinridge; 14th vice president of the United States — Administering oath

The first inauguration of Abraham Lincoln as the 16th president of the United States was held on Monday, March 4, 1861, at the East Portico of the United States Capitol in Washington, D.C. This was the 19th inauguration and marked the commencement of the first and eventually only full term of Abraham Lincoln as president and the only full term of Hannibal Hamlin as vice president. The presidential oath of office was administered to Lincoln by Chief Justice Roger B. Taney. John C. Breckinridge became the first outgoing vice president to administer the vice-presidential oath of office to his successor.

This was the first time Lincoln appeared in public with a beard, which he had begun growing after being elected president, in response to a written request by 11-year-old Grace Bedell. This effectively made him the first president to have any facial hair beyond sideburns.

On Inauguration Day, Lincoln's procession to the Capitol was surrounded by heavily armed cavalry and infantry, providing an unprecedented amount of protection for the president-elect as the nation stood on the brink of war. During the 16 weeks between Lincoln's victory in the 1860 presidential election and Inauguration Day, seven slave states had declared their secession from the Union and formed the Confederate States of America.

== Train ride to Washington ==
An entourage of family and friends left Springfield, Illinois, with President-elect Abraham Lincoln on February 11 to travel by train to Washington, D.C. for the inauguration. This group including his wife, three sons, and brother-in-law, as well as John G. Nicolay, John M. Hay, Ward Hill Lamon, David Davis, Norman B. Judd, Edwin Vose Sumner, as well as his African-American valet and bodyguard, William Henry Johnson. Just before leaving, he gave his farewell address, which was one of Lincoln's most emotional as he and the public knew that he might be killed before he could return to Springfield. Such fears would be realized in 1865 when he was assassinated; he never would return to Springfield alive after his address.

For the next ten days, he traveled widely throughout the country, with stops in Indianapolis, Columbus, Pittsburgh, Cleveland, Buffalo, Albany, New York City, and south to Philadelphia, where on the afternoon of February 21, he pulled into Kensington Station. Lincoln took an open carriage to the Continental Hotel, with almost 100,000 spectators waiting to catch a glimpse of the President-elect. There he met Mayor Alexander Henry, and delivered some remarks to the crowd outside from a hotel balcony. Lincoln continued on to Harrisburg. Then, because of an alleged assassination conspiracy, Lincoln traveled through Baltimore, Maryland, on a midnight train from Philadelphia, transferring from Baltimore's President Street Station to Camden Station at 3:30 a.m. before finally completing his journey in Washington. Johnson was the only person from the Illinois entourage to travel with Lincoln from Baltimore to Washington.

== Plot to seize the District of Columbia and install Breckinridge as president ==
Stephen Douglas, Lincoln's rival from Illinois, who defeated him for Senator and was defeated by him in the 1860 U.S. presidential election, warned in January 1861 that "a widespread and intricate conspiracy" was planning to seize the District of Columbia and install Breckinridge as president (Lincoln having never arrived in Washington).

The most intense excitement exists in certain Congressional circles In consequence of the fact leaking out that the Howard Select Committee of the House have positive evidence before them of a conspiracy existing in this city and vicinity to overthrow the government, in which certain prominent officials and citizens in Washington and elsewhere flgure. Decisive action will be taken to relation to the matter, and every man, from ex-Cabinet officers down to the humblest department clerk or Senate employe[e], will be held to the strictest account. In this emergency it is gratifying to know that, while there may be many citizens in Maryland who, when they can honorably do it, if they cannot consistently remain In the Union will go out [leave it], [but] have determined that while they do remain in it they will be loyal citizens, and when they go out will not do so dishonorably.
The existence of the conspiracy has been known to certain officials in Washington for some time.

== Inaugural address ==
He said:

The mystic chords of memory, stretching from every battlefield and patriot grave to every living heart and hearthstone all over this broad land, will yet swell the chorus of the Union, when again touched, as surely they will be, by the better angels of our nature.

== See also ==
- Presidency of Abraham Lincoln
- Second inauguration of Abraham Lincoln
- 1860 United States presidential election
- Lincoln Bible
- Abraham Lincoln's first inaugural address
