= Pride and Prejudice and Zombies =

2009 parody novel by Seth Grahame-Smith

- First edition cover, 2009
- Author: Seth Grahame-Smith and Jane Austen
- Language: English
- Genre: Comic novel, historical fiction, horror, thriller, comedy
- Published: April 1, 2009 Quirk Books, Philadelphia
- Publication place: United States
- Media type: Print (Paperback)
- Pages: 319 pp
- ISBN: 978-1-59474-334-4
- OCLC: 261176486
- Followed by: Pride and Prejudice and Zombies: Dawn of the Dreadfuls

Pride and Prejudice and Zombies is a 2009 parody novel by Seth Grahame-Smith. It is a mashup combining Jane Austen's classic 1813 novel Pride and Prejudice with elements of modern zombie fiction, crediting Austen as co-author. It was published in April 2009 by Quirk Books and in October 2009 a Deluxe Edition was released, containing full-color images and additional zombie scenes. The novel was adapted into a 2016 film starring Lily James and Sam Riley.

== Background ==
Quirk Books editor Jason Rekulak developed the idea for Pride and Prejudice and Zombies after comparing a list of "popular fanboy characters like ninjas, pirates, zombies, and monkeys" with a list of public domain book titles such as War and Peace, Crime and Punishment, and Wuthering Heights. He turned the project over to writer Seth Grahame-Smith.

[Rekulak] called me one day, out of the blue, very excitedly, and he said, "All I have is this title, and I can't stop thinking about this title." And he said: "Pride and Prejudice and Zombies". For whatever reason, it just struck me as the most brilliant thing I'd ever heard.

Grahame-Smith began with the original text of Austen's novel, adding zombie and ninja elements while developing an overall plot line for the new material; "you kill somebody off in Chapter 7, it has repercussions in Chapter 56". According to the author, the original text of the novel was well-suited for use as a zombie horror story:

You have this fiercely independent heroine, you have this dashing heroic gentleman, you have a militia camped out for seemingly no reason whatsoever nearby, and people are always walking here and there and taking carriage rides here and there ... It was just ripe for gore and senseless violence. From my perspective anyway.

In early 2009, awareness of the forthcoming novel rose due to attention from Internet bloggers, newspaper articles, National Public Radio, and podcasts. In response, the publisher increased the initial print run from 12,000 to 60,000 copies, and moved the publication date to April 1.

== Plot ==
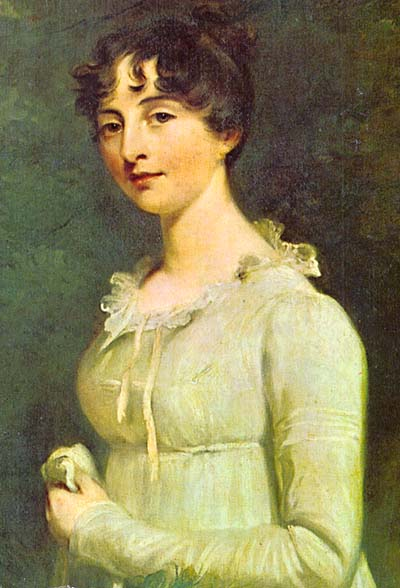
The cover, by Eric "Doogie" Horner, is a "zombification" of this painting of Marcia Fox by William Beechey.

In early 19th-century England, a zombie plague has spread across the country. Mrs. Bennet endeavours to obtain for her daughters wealthy and high-status husbands. Seeing an opportunity to achieve her goal, Mrs. Bennet sends her daughters to a local ball. At the ball, Mr. Bingley and the eldest Bennet daughter, Jane, make a connection in the midst of a chaotic zombie attack. During this time, Elizabeth meets Fitzwilliam Darcy, Mr. Bingley's closest friend. When zombies attack, the Bennet sisters use their martial arts skills to keep the human attendees safe.

Soon after, Jane is invited to visit Netherfield. Mrs. Bennet insists she travel on horseback rather than in a carriage. While traveling, Jane is attacked by zombies and injured. Elizabeth receives a letter informing the family that Jane will stay at Netherfield to recuperate, and insists on joining her sister. During their stay, Elizabeth interacts with Mr. Bingley, his family, and Mr. Darcy often. Once Jane is fully recovered, Mr. Bingley is persuaded by Mrs. Bennet to throw a ball.

Jane and Elizabeth return home. The odious heir to Longbourn, Mr. Bennet's cousin Mr. Collins, arrives with the intention of marrying one of the Bennet daughters and settles his attentions on Elizabeth. When the local militia arrives in town to exhume and destroy dead bodies, the Bennet sisters also meet the charming George Wickham, whom Mr. Darcy and Mr. Bingley seem to avoid. Wickham explains to Elizabeth that he grew up with Mr. Darcy, but they had a falling out after Wickham was denied the living he had been promised by Mr. Darcy's late father, justifying Elizabeth's negative opinion of Mr. Darcy. She looks forward to meeting Wickham again at the Netherfield ball, but later learns he was not invited. Mr. Darcy asks Elizabeth to dance. The ball is interrupted by a zombie attack, which is thwarted by Mr. Darcy.

The next day, Mr. Collins asks Elizabeth to marry him. She refuses, angering her mother. Mr. Collins instead proposes to Charlotte Lucas, Elizabeth's best friend and a spinster, who accepts. She has been secretly infected with the 'mysterious plague' and hopes Mr. Collins will be too oblivious to notice her slowly becoming a zombie. Jane receives a letter from Caroline Bingley, informing her that Mr. Bingley and his party are en route to London with no plans to return soon. The letter also convinces Jane that Mr. Bingley wants to marry Darcy's younger sister.

Elizabeth's dislike for Darcy intensifies when she learns that he purposefully plotted to separate Bingley from her sister, Jane. Elizabeth vows to avenge the separation by killing Darcy, and she is afforded that opportunity when he appears unannounced at a cottage where she is visiting her newlywed friend Charlotte. Darcy surprises her by proposing marriage, and they break into a verbal and physical fight in which Darcy is wounded. He escapes and writes a long letter to Elizabeth explaining his actions: that he separated Jane and Bingley out of fear that Jane had contracted the "mysterious plague", and that Wickham had lied about not receiving his inheritance. Elizabeth realizes that she has judged Darcy too harshly whilst Darcy realizes that his demeanour encourages people to believe the rumours about him and both resolve to correct their personal short-comings.

Elizabeth embarks on a trip around the country with her aunt and uncle, fighting zombies along the way. At Pemberley she encounters Darcy, who repels a horde of zombies. Darcy's changed attitude and manners impress Elizabeth and lead her to consider reconciling their relationship. The Bennets spend time with Darcy, his sister, and Mr. Bingley, who still has feelings for Jane. The visit ends abruptly when Elizabeth learns Lydia has run away with Wickham and she returns home to support her family.

A letter is delivered to Longbourn, stating that Lydia and Wickham are now married, Wickham's numerous debts have been settled, and he is now crippled. Elizabeth eventually discovers that it was Darcy who engineered the union and paid Wickham's debts as well as Lydia's dowry, thus saving the Bennet family from scandal and financial ruin.

Darcy and Bingley return to the countryside, and Bingley resumes courting Jane. Elizabeth hopes to renew her relationship with Darcy, but his aunt, the Lady Catherine, interferes and insists that her daughter Anne is a better match for her nephew. Lady Catherine challenges Elizabeth to a duel, committed to eliminating the competition, but Elizabeth defeats her. Elizabeth spares Catherine's life. Darcy is touched by this gesture and returns to Elizabeth. They marry and begin a long and happy future together, insofar as the ever-present threat of zombie apocalypse permits.

== Reception ==
Entertainment Weekly reviewed Pride and Prejudice and Zombies favorably, giving it a grade of A−. Library Journal recommended the novel "for all popular fiction collections". The A.V. Club gave the novel a grade of A, commenting that "[w]hat begins as a gimmick ends with renewed appreciation of the indomitable appeal of Austen's language, characters, and situations." The New Yorker's Macy Halford called the book's estimated blend of eighty-five percent Austen's words and fifteen percent Grahame-Smith's "one hundred per cent terrible"; while she admitted that the mashup may have accurately identified a subtextual theme of "mystery and menace" in the original novel, she still found Grahame-Smith's writing awful, singling out a passage in which Elizabeth Bennet prepares to kill Mr. Darcy over an overheard slight.

As of April 19, 2009, Pride and Prejudice and Zombies was number three on the New York Times bestseller list. On the same morning, the book moved from the 300s to 27th place on amazon.co.uk's bestseller list. Before the book was published in the United Kingdom, it required a second printing.

== Adaptations ==
=== Comics ===
In May 2010, Pride and Prejudice and Zombies: The Graphic Novel was published by Del Rey / Random House, with comic writer Tony Lee adapting the text and art by Cliff Richards.

In October 2011, an interactive ebook version produced by PadWorx Digital Media Inc. was released.

=== Game ===
In June 2010, an app based on Pride and Prejudice and Zombies was released for the iPod Touch and iPhone. Digital development specialist Freeverse is behind the app, and describes the title as "a rollicking action title with the perfect blend of zombie slaying action and touching romance narrative".

=== Film ===
A film adaptation was in conversation since February 2009, when The Sunday Times reported that Hollywood was bidding to turn Pride and Prejudice and Zombies into a blockbuster film. At a book-signing held at California State University Fullerton on April 23, 2009, Grahame-Smith said the novel had officially been purchased by an undisclosed major film company to be produced as a feature film.

Lionsgate originally planned to finance and distribute the film, with Natalie Portman playing the lead role, but she later reconsidered and decided to serve as a producer instead. In addition, David O. Russell would have directed; however, he left production due to scheduling conflicts. Mike White was hired to direct the adaptation, but he also left the project in January 2011 due to scheduling conflicts. Craig Gillespie finalized a contract to direct the film on April 18, 2011, but left the project in October.

On May 2, 2013, Lily James confirmed that the film was still in the works and announced that she would star in the film as a leading role. The project was also set to feature extensive involvement from Burr Steers. On August 4, 2014, it was announced that filming would begin in September, with Lily James as Elizabeth, Sam Riley as Mr. Darcy, and Bella Heathcote as one of Elizabeth's sisters. Jack Huston joined the cast as Mr. Wickham. Douglas Booth joined the cast as Mr. Bingley. Matt Smith joined the cast as Mr. Collins, with shooting scheduled to begin on September 24. On September 23, 2014, it was announced that Game of Thrones' Charles Dance and Lena Headey had joined the cast, and that Screen Gems purchased the rights to release it in the United States.

Pride and Prejudice and Zombies was released on February 5, 2016 to mixed critical reviews and commercial failure, grossing $16.4 million worldwide from a $28 million budget.

== Book series ==
=== Prequel ===
On October 30, 2009, Quirk Books announced that the third book in its Quirk Classics series would be a prequel, Pride and Prejudice and Zombies: Dawn of the Dreadfuls. The prequel was published on March 30, 2010. It explored how Elizabeth Bennet became such a seasoned zombie hunter and dealt with her early martial arts training and her unfortunate early romantic experiences before the events of the first novel. Seth Grahame-Smith did not write the prequel because he was engaged in writing Abraham Lincoln, Vampire Hunter; instead, Steve Hockensmith authored the work.

=== Sequel ===
Steve Hockensmith also wrote a sequel in the series titled Pride and Prejudice and Zombies: Dreadfully Ever After, which was released on March 22, 2011.

== Cultural influence ==
The success of Pride and Prejudice and Zombies has led to several other mash-ups pairing classical works or historical figures with modern horror themes such as Sense and Sensibility and Sea Monsters, and Abraham Lincoln: Vampire Hunter.

In 2016, Hot Topic released a clothing collection inspired by the Regency-era fashion and "inner zombie slayer" style of the book.

== See also ==
- Sense and Sensibility and Sea Monsters
- List of literary adaptations of Pride and Prejudice
