= Move Under Ground =

2004 novel by Nick Mamatas

- Cover
- Author: Nick Mamatas
- Language: English
- Genre: Horror
- Publisher: Night Shade Books
- Publication date: 15 May 2004
- Publication place: United States
- Media type: Print (Hardback & Paperback)
- Pages: 191 (first edition, hardback)
- ISBN: 1-892389-91-6 (first edition, hardback)
- OCLC: 55647282

Move Under Ground is a horror novel mashup by American writer Nick Mamatas, which combines the Beat style of Jack Kerouac with the cosmic horror of H. P. Lovecraft's Cthulhu Mythos. It is available as a free download via a Creative Commons license, CC BY-NC-ND 2.5 according to the License information in the CC version of the book.

== Plot summary ==
Jack Kerouac witnesses the rising of R'lyeh off the California coast. With Neal Cassady and William S. Burroughs, Kerouac takes to the road, crossing America to save the world from a Lovecraftian cult.

== Characters ==
- Azathoth
- William S. Burroughs
- Neal Cassady
- Cthulhu
- Allen Ginsberg
- Jack Kerouac
- Bodhisattva Kilaya

== Source references ==
=== Beat connections ===
- The novel begins with Kerouac in Big Sur, the setting of his novel of the same name, and numerous mentions are made of his "heading out on the road again", a reference to his 1957 On the Road.
- The slaves of Cthulhu are referred to as "mugwumps", from the predatory creatures of Burroughs' Naked Lunch.
- When Burroughs appears, he is wielding a pair of pistols and is said to be playing William Tell, a reference to his alleged killing of Joan Vollmer while playing William Tell.
- Burroughs mentions that his book has been unbanned and thanks Kerouac for the title, which references Naked Lunch, the title of which was suggested by Kerouac.
- Kerouac mentions Dean Moriarty, the name of the protagonist of On the Road who was strongly inspired by Neal Cassady, and Jack Duluoz, the name Kerouac gives himself in many of his works.

=== Cthulhu Mythos connections ===
- Cthulhu is the central enemy of the book, and the squares are turned into beings resembling his star-spawn.
- R'lyeh is seen to rise when the stars are right; however, it is located "closer than Communist Cuba" off the Californian coast, not in its usual location in the South Pacific, however, this may be due to the twisted geometry mentioned below.
- Cassidy mentions the Three-Lobed Burning Eye and the "Al-Azif" to Kerouac in predicting the coming apocalypse. Kerouac later states that he sent Cthulhu back to "strange aeons," another reference to the Necronomicon.
- The Elder Gods and Great Old Ones are also mentioned.
- Kerouac enters the Dreamlands at one point.
- Numerous references are made to "the Call of Cthulhu."
- Shoggoths appear several times; however, instead of how they are usually depicted in the Mythos, they appear as agents of Cthulhu that assume the shapes, forms, or personal appearances most likely to drive their target mad.
- Kerouac talks about trying to get the government to send the "Sea Hunt and gut the Elder God," a possible reference to the submarine torpedoing of Y'ha-nthlei at the beginning/end of "The Shadow Over Innsmouth."
- As Cthulhu's power rises, America becomes distorted by non-Euclidean geometry.
- A reference is made to Lovecraft himself; a worker mentions how a serious "gentleman from Providence" named Mr. Love passed through several weeks earlier, predicting the onslaught and building a lighthouse in the desert. He is described as having "eyes so round like a frog's [with a] lipless mouth," characteristics matching the "Innsmouth Look" of the Deep Ones.
- Kerouac observes Azathoth in the twisted constellations. Cassady later becomes an avatar for Azathoth.
- After Cthulhu comes to power, all money must be stamped with the Elder Sign; both Lovecraft's branching symbol and August Derleth's five-pointed flaming star variants are mentioned. This could be a reference to the Mark of the Beast being needed for commerce.
- Chicago is described as being formed of "Cyclopean modern towers and pinnacles rising flowerlike and delicate like spun crystal"; this is similar to Lovecraft's description of R'lyeh, Pnakotus, and the City of the Old Ones.
- The established religions all begin preaching to Cthulhu rather than the Christian god; they are referred to as "cargo cults" and Kerouac uses the term "starry wisdom" to describe them. These are references to several Cthulhu Mythos cults, specifically the Church of Starry Wisdom and the Esoteric Order of Dagon.

== Awards and nominations ==
- 2004, Locus Magazine Recommended Reading List for books published in 2004
- 2005, nominated, Bram Stoker Award for Best First Novel
- 2005, nominated, International Horror Guild Award for Best First Novel in 2005

== Limited edition ==
The limited edition hardcover includes the short story "Jitterbuggin'", an afterword, a bound-in ribbon bookmark, and a unique Lovecraftian senryū written by Mamatas. 100 copies of the limited edition were produced, and the senryū were collected as Cthulhu Senryū (Prime Books, 2006)

== Reception ==
Move Under Ground was widely and positively reviewed, by trade, genre, and non-genre publications. In addition to reviews in Publishers Weekly and Booklist, the book received positive notices from Fangoria, Locus, Green Man Review, Bookslut, and other genre-themed publications and columns. More unusually for a first horror novel from an independent press, Move Under Ground was reviewed by publications more widely known for reviewing avant-garde and literary fiction, including The Believer, Village Voice, and the American Book Review.

Positive word of mouth continued long after the releases of the hardcover and paperback releases. As recently as 2009, major genre publications such as Tor.com published an article on the book by novelist Jon Evans. In September 2010, Kenneth Hite declared the book one of the best Cthulhu Mythos stories not written by Lovecraft, in his book Cthulhu 101. Hite also declared the book one of the top five Mythos novels of all time via Twitter. In an October 2010 podcast and interview, author Nick Mamatas explained that his goal in writing Move Under Ground was to write a novel that would still be discussed ten years after its initial publication, referencing The Enemies of Promise by Cyril Connolly.
