= William Henry Johnson (valet) =

Valet to Abraham Lincoln (1833–1864)

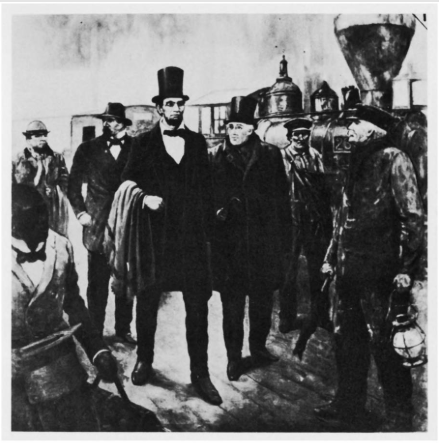
Abraham Lincoln arriving in Washington; the figure in the lower left hand corner is sometimes said to be William H. Johnson but this is not documented. Date unknown. Lincoln, Ward Hill Lamon, and detectives traveled a secret route from Harrisburg, Pennsylvania to Washington, D.C. to prevent an assassination attempt, called the Baltimore Plot.

William Henry Johnson (March 4, 1833 – January 28, 1864) was a free African American and a sometime personal valet of Abraham Lincoln. Having first worked for Lincoln in Springfield, Illinois, Johnson accompanied the President-Elect to Washington, D.C. for his first inauguration (1861).

Once there, he was employed in various jobs, part-time as President's valet and barber, and later, following strife with others on the White House staff, as a messenger for the Treasury Department at $600 (equivalent to US$21,500 in 2025) per year. Johnson traveled with Lincoln in November 1863 to Gettysburg, Pennsylvania, where Lincoln gave the Gettysburg Address. While traveling, Lincoln experienced symptoms of the onset of smallpox. At that time, an epidemic was spreading through Washington, D.C. and Lincoln's son Tad Lincoln had smallpox. Johnson tended to Lincoln and became quite ill by January 12, 1864, when he was admitted to a hospital. Johnson died within the next couple of weeks.

== Personal life ==
Johnson's mother was an enslaved woman. He had a growing family while living in Washington, D.C. Dick Hart, past president of the Abraham Lincoln Association and historian who focuses on black history in Springfield, has been unsuccessful in finding any information about Johnson in Springfield. In Washington, Lincoln co-guaranteed the mortgage on the house Johnson bought for his family.

== Career ==
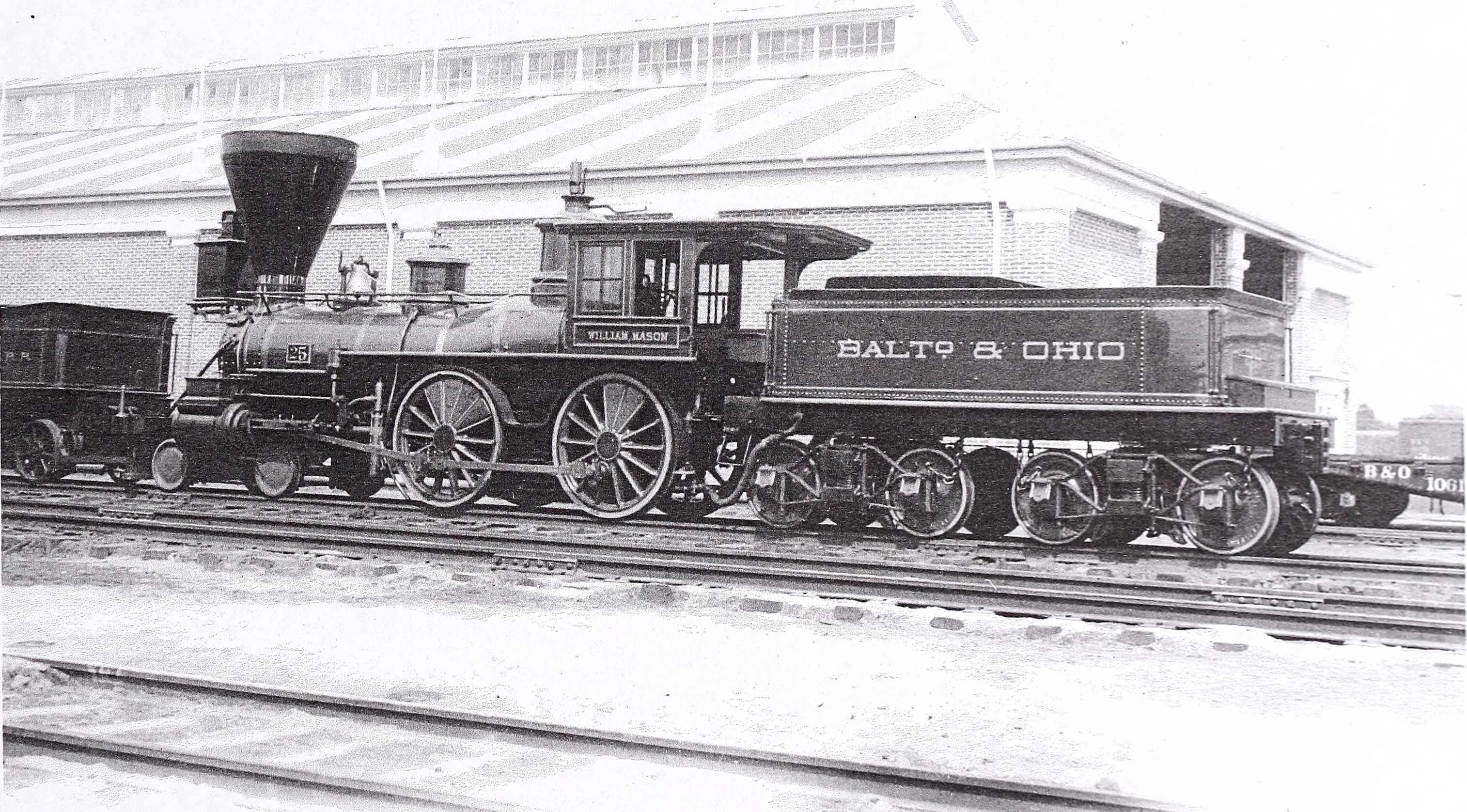
The train that transported Lincoln to Washington for his 1861 inauguration

Either before or while working for Lincoln, Johnson was also a bootblack and barber. Abraham Lincoln employed Johnson as a valet and driver in Springfield, Illinois during the time of the 1860 United States presidential election. The Lincolns hosted an event for the Republican Presidential Nomination Notification Committee on May 19, 1860, at their house in Springfield, Illinois. Johnson announced people as they entered the house and directed them to the parlour to meet Abraham and Mary Todd Lincoln.

Lincoln brought Johnson with him to the White House for his first inauguration. During the train trip, Johnson was observed by reporters to be attentive with untiring vigilance and acted as if he was an unofficial bodyguard. Lincoln said that Johnson was a worthy man of integrity and faithfulness. To evade an assassination attempt (called the Baltimore Plot), Lincoln left the train he was expected to arrive on in Washington. He boarded another train that took him from Harrisburg, Pennsylvania to Washington, transferring under cover of darkness in Baltimore. Lincoln's lawyer friend, Ward Hill Lamon, was the only person from Lincoln's Illinois entourage known to have traveled from Harrisburg through Baltimore to Washington with Lincoln to elude potential assassins of the Baltimore Plot, and there is no record that Johnson was present on this dangerous stretch of the journey. [Lamon, 42–47; Holzer, 392–396].

Johnson worked for Lincoln as a barber, valet, handyman, messenger, and bodyguard. The president said of him, "although not exactly the most prominent, [he] is yet the most useful member of the presidential party." Lincoln trusted him to convey messages, and at times significant sums of money.

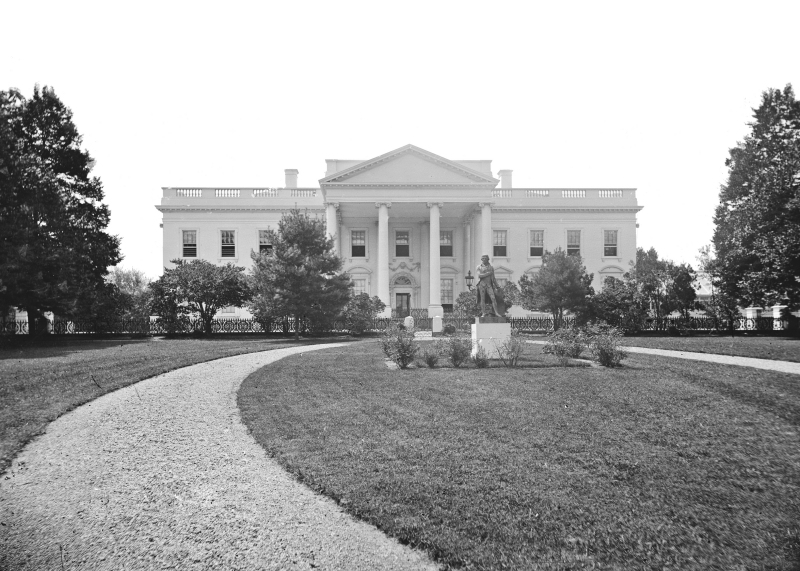
The White House (also called the Executive Mansion) during the American Civil War

Johnson was shunned and treated miserably by others on the White House serving staff, because they were not welcoming of newcomers, did not want a change in the established pecking order among staff, and disliked that he was a particularly dark-skinned African-American. Until that point, all servants of the White House were light-skinned. It was clear within the first week that an employment change was needed for Johnson. Lincoln first wrote to the Secretary of the Navy Gideon Welles, but a suitable position was not found. In the meantime, Johnson continued his position, running errands some days that would take him out of the mansion for part or all of the day. At Lincoln's request, Secretary of the Treasury Salmon P. Chase gave him a job in November or December, 1861, first as a laborer, and soon after as a messenger. [Roy P. Basler, ed., Collected Works of Abraham Lincoln, V, 33].

If Lincoln needed Johnson's assistance for errands or tasks, he would send a message to his supervisor, Samuel Yorke At Lee, at the Treasury. Before working at the Treasury each workday morning, Johnson went to the White House and shaved and dressed Lincoln, which provided extra income.

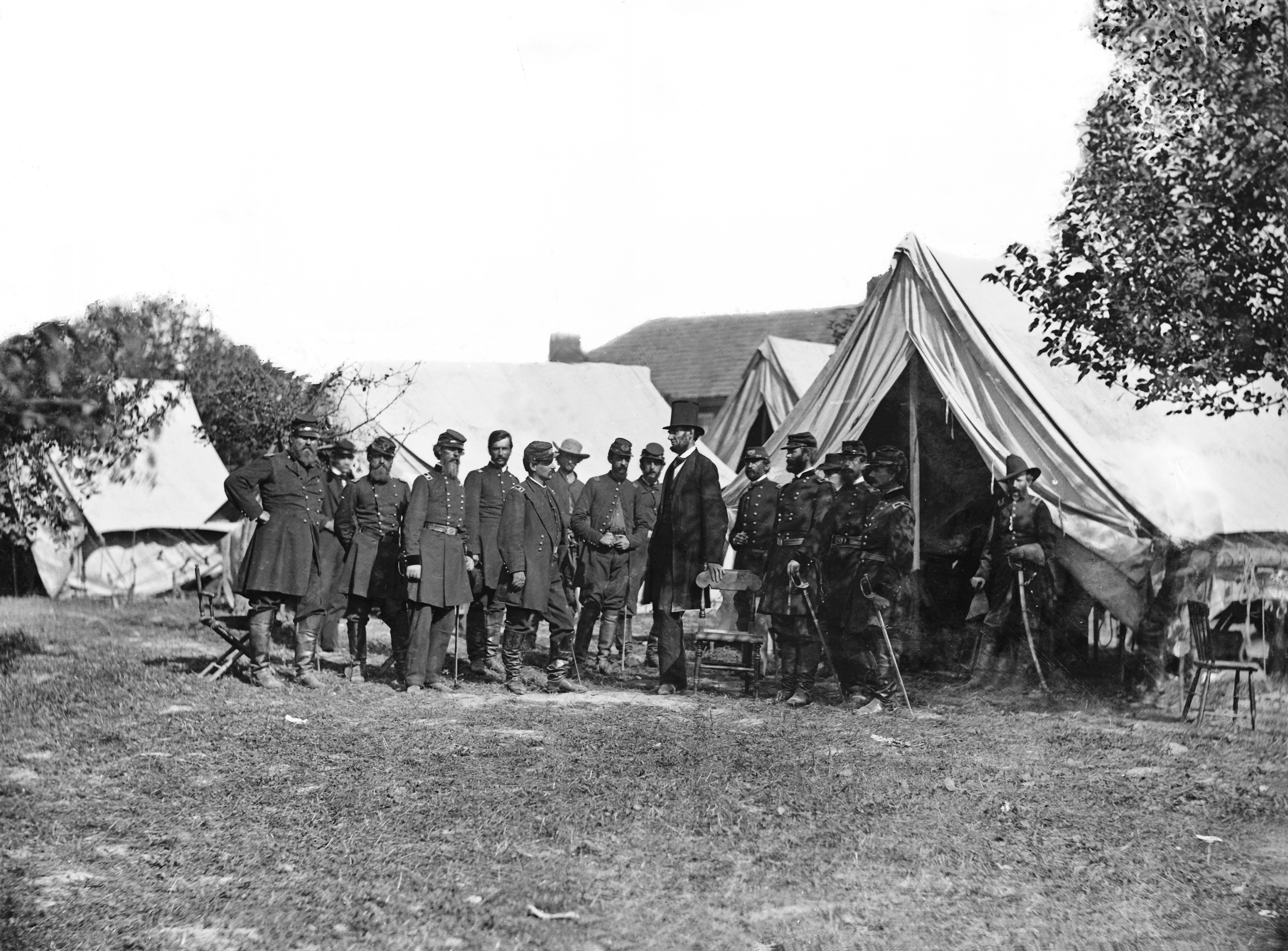
Lincoln with George B. McClellan and staff at the Grove Farm after the Battle of Antietam. Notable figures (from left) are 1. Col. Delos Sackett; 4. Gen. George W. Morell; 5. Alexander S. Webb, Chief of Staff, V Corps; 6. McClellan;. 8. Dr. Jonathan Letterman; 10. Lincoln; 11. Henry J. Hunt; 12. Fitz John Porter; 15. Andrew A. Humphreys; 16. Capt. George Armstrong Custer.

I think Lincoln's constant interest in William Johnson shows us, even more than do some of his greatest public deeds and much heralded acts, the great heart of this man. He had induced Johnson to leave Springfield and accompany him to Washington on a most perilous journey and thereafter never ceased to be interested in him, but continued to assist him in every manner possible.

— John E. Washington, They Knew Lincoln

Besides both men having felt free to ask favors of one another, it is assumed that Johnson was treated equitably as any other man. Frederick Douglass, the black abolitionist, said of Lincoln, "He was the first great man that I talked with in the United States freely, who in no single instance reminded me of the difference between himself and myself, of the difference of color…" When he referred to him in letters, though, Lincoln called the 27 year-old Johnson a "colored boy." [Basler, Collected Works, V, 33]

In 1862, Johnson accompanied Lincoln to the Antietam Battlefield after the battle and the Confederate Army had left the area. He went with Lincoln on other trips.

== Smallpox ==
There was a smallpox epidemic in Washington, D.C. during the winter of 1863–1864. On November 18, 1863, Johnson traveled by train with Lincoln to Gettysburg, Pennsylvania, for the dedication of the Soldiers' National Cemetery where Lincoln would deliver the Gettysburg Address. On the train ride to Gettysburg, Lincoln looked "sallow, sunken-eyed, thin, [and] careworn".

Lincoln's son, Tad Lincoln, had smallpox on the day that Lincoln left for Gettysburg, which prevented Mary Todd Lincoln from traveling with the President.

During Lincoln's speech, he was described by newspaper reporters as "listless", "sweating", and "discouraged". On the return trip Lincoln went to bed in the Presidential train car with a bad headache. Johnson kept his forehead cool by bathing his forehead in cold water.

Lincoln's illness was diagnosed as "Varioloid" which is a mild form of smallpox. Long thought to have been only a mild case, recent work suggests it was a serious illness. He was bedridden and finally recovering on December 15.

Johnson cared for Lincoln during his illness. Johnson contracted the disease and ultimately died in mid-January 1864. Lincoln paid off the mortgage on the Johnson family's house and sent money to his family. He paid off half of a loan that he had cosigned; the banker insisted on canceling the other half of the debt.

== Burial ==
Graves of African-American civilians, marked "Citizen", in Arlington National Cemetery

Lincoln also paid for Johnson's burial at an unknown location. While many modern accounts have placed Johnson's grave in Arlington National Cemetery, all such claims are ultimately based on the same, almost certainly incorrect assumption by the historian Roy P. Basler.

In 1972, Basler claimed that Lincoln had buried Johnson in grave no. 3346 in Section 27 of Arlington National Cemetery, where there is indeed a headstone for one "William H. Johnson, Citizen." In 1977, Basler admitted, however, that he had originally decided to search Arlington "on a hunch," and that he had no evidence connecting the occupant of that grave (or even the cemetery at large) to Lincoln's valet of the same name. In 2006, Gabor Boritt repeated Basler's original anecdote, adding, without substantiation, that Lincoln himself had ordered that Johnson's headstone be inscribed with the epitaph, "Citizen." In 2010, Eric Foner in turn cited Boritt's work, further adding, also without substantiation, that Lincoln "chose the one-word-inscription [as] a direct refutation of the Dred Scott decision."

In 2012, Phillip W. Magness and Sebastian N. Page challenged all the above "embellishments" to the simple fact of Lincoln having paid for Johnson's coffin. Magness and Page observed that "Citizen" appears on all headstones in Section 27 at Arlington, having been used as a synonym for "Civilian" in the brief period before the cemetery became an exclusively military one. Moreover, they noted that the headstone visible today is a 1990s replacement for an original erected only in the 1870s, thus precluding Lincoln's involvement with any inscription; that Johnson's name, even with his middle initial, was too common for historians to reasonably assume the relevant grave his; and that, when Johnson died, the official conversion of the Arlington estate to a cemetery lay some months in the future. Instead, the single likeliest resting-place for an early 1864 black victim of smallpox was Columbian Harmony Cemetery, cleared in 1959 for redevelopment.

== In popular culture ==
William H. Johnson was a character in the 2012 film Abraham Lincoln: Vampire Hunter, played by actor Anthony Mackie. In the film, Lincoln and Johnson are portrayed as childhood friends. In the film's opening scene, a young Lincoln rushes to the aid of a young Johnson, who is being whipped by a slaver. Johnson then goes on to work in the Lincoln White House and assist President Lincoln in his fight against the vampiric forces of the Confederate Army.
