= The Last American Vampire =

2015 novel by Seth Grahame-Smith

- The Last American Vampire
- Author: Seth Grahame-Smith
- Cover artist: Robert Doisneau
- Language: English
- Genre: Comic novel, horror, historical, thriller
- Published: January 13, 2015, Grand Central Publishing, New York
- Publication place: United States
- Media type: Print (Hardcover, Paperback) e-Book (Kindle); Audio Book (CD)
- Pages: 416 pp
- ISBN: 978-1455502127

The Last American Vampire is a historical fiction novel by Seth Grahame-Smith and a sequel to Abraham Lincoln: Vampire Hunter, released on January 13, 2015, through New York–based publishing company Grand Central Publishing.

The novels follows the life of a vampire named Henry Sturges, with major plot details occurring between 1888 and 1963. Real people depicted in the novel include Virginia Dare, Abraham Lincoln, Mark Twain, Henry Irving, John Hay, John D. Rockefeller, Bram Stoker, Nikola Tesla, Theodore Roosevelt, Arthur Conan Doyle, Grigori Rasputin, Jack the Ripper, Franklin D. Roosevelt, Adolf Hitler, John A. McCone, Eliot Ness, Alexei Romanov, Howard Hughes, John F. Kennedy, and Lee Harvey Oswald.

== Plot ==
Henry Sturges arrives in North America in 1587 and helps found the Roanoke Colony. The following year, the colony's physician, Dr. Thomas Crowley, is exposed as a vampire and massacres the settlement, sparing only Henry—whom he turns into a vampire—and Virginia Dare. Henry later attempts to kill Crowley, driving him into the forest, before raising Virginia among the Algonquin people. The two marry in 1604, but three years later John Smith and his men massacre the Algonquin village while forcing Henry and Virginia to watch. Traumatized and vengeful, Virginia convinces Henry to turn her into a vampire but disappears shortly after her transformation.

Several weeks after the assassination of Abraham Lincoln, Henry breaks into Lincoln's tomb in Springfield and resurrects him as a vampire. Horrified by what he has become, Lincoln leaps from a window and allows himself to burn to death.

In 1888, Henry is summoned to New York City by the de facto leader of the Union of Vampires, Adam Plantagenet, born the bastard son of Edward II in 1305. Adam shows him five boxes containing the severed heads of Union ambassadors, each accompanied by a note reading "No more Americans" and signed by someone calling himself "A. Grander VIII". Tasked with finding and stopping Grander, Henry travels to London, where he discovers that Henry Irving is a vampire. There he befriends Irving's assistant, Bram Stoker, who already knows vampires exist. Henry and Stoker later enlist Arthur Conan Doyle to help stop Jack the Ripper, revealed to be Thomas Crowley. In 1898, Adam Plantagenet is killed by Grander. Henry returns to New York for the funeral, spots Grander observing from afar, and pursues him, but Grander escapes on horseback.

In 1901, President Theodore Roosevelt recruits Henry as a covert agent for the federal government, believing Grander to be responsible for the wave of anarchism linked to the assassinations of President William McKinley, French President Sadi Carnot, and Italian King Umberto I. In 1916, aided by Nikola Tesla and his teleforce, Henry kills the vampire Grigori Rasputin on the orders of President Woodrow Wilson and goes on to serve in World War I.

In 1920, Henry meets with John D. Rockefeller, who reveals that Grander is Virginia Dare and Abraham Lincoln is still alive, having survived his suicide attempt and later fought in the Battle of Belleau Wood. Henry reunites and reconciles with Lincoln, who joins him on government missions that include investigating the Osage Indian murders and the Lindbergh kidnapping, fighting the Ku Klux Klan, and serving among Eliot Ness' Untouchables.

In 1937, President Franklin D. Roosevelt orders Henry and Lincoln to assassinate Adolf Hitler. They travel to Berlin disguised in SS uniforms and plant a bomb beneath the stage at the Berlin Sportpalast, but it fails to detonate. As they return to America aboard the Hindenburg they are ambushed by Virginia Dare. Henry is forced to set the Hindenburg ablaze to enable their escape and presumes Virginia dead. Henry and Lincoln subsequently serve in World War II.

In 1953, Henry meets Howard Hughes and learns he is a vampire, having been resurrected after his 1946 plane crash at the request of the government. Hughes explains that he is attempting to cure vampirism through his new medical research organization and persuades Henry to invest. Hughes ultimately dies for the final time in 1976 after failed experiments on himself.

In 1959, Virginia Dare collaborates with the Soviet Union to make Lee Harvey Oswald into a sleeper agent. Four years later, Oswald assassinates John F. Kennedy before Virginia orders Jack Ruby to kill him in turn. When Virginia visits the Parkland Memorial Hospital morgue to confirm Oswald's death, Henry and Lincoln ambush her. Lincoln is killed in the ensuing battle, but Henry succeeds in killing Virginia. Grieving the deaths of both Lincoln and Kennedy, he angrily resigns from government service and spends the next thirty years in isolation.

In 1998, Henry is visited by Alexei Romanov, who survived his family's murder after Rasputin turned him into a vampire. Alexei explains that the Union of Vampires has been reconstituted and urges Henry to rejoin its cause, but Henry declines. Following the September 11 attacks, however, Henry reflects on Lincoln's journals and examines Alexei's card, suggesting he may reconsider his retirement.

== Television adaptation ==
In October 2018, it was announced that NBC had given a "script commitment plus penalty" to a television adaptation of the novel from author Seth Grahame-Smith, David Katzenberg, Terry Matalas, and 20th Century Fox Television. Matalas will write the potential series and executive-produce alongside Grahame-Smith and Katzenberg. It was to be on Quibi, but with the shuttering of Quibi, there is no update on the show.

== See also ==
- Vampire literature
