= I Am Providence (Mamatas novel) =

2016 murder mystery novel by Nick Mamatas

- Author: Nick Mamatas
- Audio read by: Joel Richards; Rachel Jacobs
- Language: English
- Genre: Murder mystery
- Publisher: Night Shade Books
- Publication date: 2016
- Publication place: United States
- Media type: Print (paperback) e-book audiobook
- Pages: 276 pages
- ISBN: 1597808350

I Am Providence is a 2016 murder mystery novel by American author Nick Mamatas. It was first published in paperback on August 9, 2016 through Night Shade Books in the United States and United Kingdom. The work alternately follows two writers both before and after one of them is murdered.

== Synopsis ==
The book follows two horror writers, Colleen Danzig and Panos Panossian, the latter of whom is strongly disliked in the Lovecraft literary community. Both writers are attending the Summer Tentacular, a Lovecraft themed convention held in Providence, Rhode Island, and sharing a room together. Before the first day of the convention's end, Panossian is brutally murdered, his face peeled off of his body, mimicking an anonymous post left for Panossian on his blog by someone years ago who appears to know a great deal about his past.

The novel's chapters alternatively follow both writers. The third-person chapters following Colleen are partially set before Panossian's murder while his chapters are told after his death, as his disembodied consciousness drifts around the convention following participants and thinking about his past. Panossian can feel his nerves dying and his brain shriveling like a ‘sponge in the sun’, and he spends his time lamenting over not remembering who it was that killed him, trying to figure it out, and letting his mind drift into long monologues about his past and opinions, his thoughts on Lovecraft, and his opinions on the other con-goers.

Colleen recklessly searches for the truth and believes that there's a connection between "Arkham," the book Panossian was supposed to be selling when he died, and who killed him. The book is rumored to be bound in human skin. She corners Chloe, another one of the authors, in a bathroom where a physical altercation takes place.

She then convinces Hiram to give her a ride with partial lies. The truth is that they're following a group of others from the con into the forest, where she believes they're doing something related to the murder. She calls the police and it's revealed that they were just trying to locate the grave of H.P. Lovecraft's long-deceased cat. Colleen is taken in for questioning many times, and is banned from the convention for her assault on Chloe. From the Mortuary, Panossian can hear the interrogations and uses them to further speculate on who may have killed him.

After the night in the woods, Colleen finds out that another writer from the con was killed: Charles Cudmore, who she mentally calls "asparagus head" due to his malformed head and haircut. His death is dissimilar to Panossians, leading Colleen to believe that he was killed because he knew too much. She goes to Norman, another's con-attendee's room to look for more info after finding out that a drag queen named Ms. Phantasia and Chloe have been accused. She doesn't get much from this encounter and ends up having to take part in a group attempt to summon Cthulhu. She is taken into custody once more when the police arrive, and during her subsequent interrogation believes that the police are trying to hint at her to help. She is given an eventful ride back to the hotel for the closing ceremonies.

During an odd speech on Christianity, Hiram tries to hint at her to leave but it's too late. Colleen is tackled because it's believed that she's the real killer. She manages to escape and an officer drives her out of state. Whilst at the airport, she is looking into some of the con-goers and their pasts and is struck by inspiration. She returns to Providence.

From his position, Panossian hears who murdered him reveal themself, an exchange that is overheard by Colleen and Hiram. The book ends with gunshots and Colleen whispering to an unknown other person that it will be okay as Panossian finally slips away for good.

== Reception ==
Publishers Weekly and NPR both reviewed the work, the latter of which felt that the book's coverage of a niche fandom harmed more than helped the book because "As deep as the book gets, it's equally narrow, and no matter how accessible Mamatas makes his mystery, it's still mired in the in-fighting and minutia of a subculture that few can relate to." Tor.com was critical of I Am Providence, writing "Clearly, there are some great ideas in here, but even if you can get past the flat characters and the circumnavigative narrative and the nastiness of the entire enterprise, I Am Providence goes nowhere of note, oh-so-slowly."

Locus Online and Fangoria were more favorable towards the work, with Locus Online stating that "Mythos fans, mystery fans, and convention-goers (some of us are all three!) will all find plenty to like here."
