= Holmes on the Range =

2006 novel by Steve Hockensmith

- Author: Steve Hockensmith
- Publisher: St. Martin's Minotaur
- Publication date: February 7, 2006
- ISBN: 9780312347802
- Followed by: On the Wrong Track (2007)

Holmes on the Range is the debut novel from Steve Hockensmith, published February 7, 2006, by St. Martin's Minotaur. It introduced the characters of Gustav "Old Red" Amlingmeyer and his younger brother Otto "Big Red" Amlingmeyer.

In 2007, Holmes on the Range was a finalist for the Anthony Award for Best First Novel, Dilys Award, Edgar Allan Poe Award for Best First Novel, Macavity Award for Best First Novel, and Shamus Award for Best First Novel.

== Plot summary ==
In 1892, cowboy Gustav "Old Red" Amlingmeyer listens to a Sherlock Holmes story "The Red-Headed League" read by his younger brother Otto "Big Red" Amlingmeyer while on a cattle drive, and decides to follow in his new hero's footsteps by using logic and observation to solve mysteries. Unfortunately for him, cowboys do not often stumble on to mysteries and he practices his craft until the pair are hired by a ranch to perform maintenance. When the general manager of the ranch shows up dead after a stampede and everyone believes it an accident despite some suspicious circumstances, Old Red uses his new skills to see that there is more to it than what appears. As the mystery gets deeper and the bodies start to mount, the brothers learn that there is more to solving crimes then simply following the clues - there are also bullets to dodge.

== Characters ==
- Gustav Amlingmeyer aka "Old Red" - Elder of the Amlingmeyer brothers, inspired by the tales of Sherlock Holmes to use his methods of observation and deduction to elevate himself to become a consulting detective. Quiet and reserved, he earned his nickname for having a "crabby old man" sort of attitude, despite only being 27 years old.
- Otto Amlingmeyer aka "Big Red" - Younger of the Amlingmeyer brothers, he follows Gustav on his detective dreams out of obligation to Gustav who represents the only family Otto has left in the world. He has taken to become Gustav's "Doc Watson" by chronicling his exploits.

=== Cantlemere Ranch ===
- Mr. Perkins - General Manager - A quiet and closed-off figure. Rarely seen outside of his office.
- Uly McPherson - Foreman - A large and intimidating man, Uly runs the Cantlemere with an iron fist and a short temper.
- Ambrose "Spider" McPherson - Uly's younger brother. A sinister looking gunman who earned his nickname from his odd habit of catching flies out of the air and eating them.
- Boudreaux - Ranch Hand - An albino African-American. Boudreaux, also known as "Boo" or "Spook" by the other hands, is extremely quiet and aloof. When he does speak, his voice is low and rumbling and he keeps his words to a minimum.
- The Swede - Ranch cook - An expert cook with an inexpert grasp on the English language.
- The Peacock - a well-dressed cowboy who does very little work.

=== Hornet's Nest Hires ===
- Tall John Harrington - a tall, lanky cowboy with a slow wit and a penchant for flatulence humor.
- Pinky Harris - a small-statured cow hand with a rosy-pink complexion. Has a weakness for alcohol.
- Swivel-eye Smith - a level-headed cowboy with crossed eyes.
- Crazy Mouth Nick Dury - a transplanted cowboy from London, England. Earned his nickname from his thick cockney accent which none of his fellow drovers can understand.
- Anytime McCoy - a gruff and surly cow hand with a reputation of being the "biggest a**hole in the territory.

=== Investors & staff from England ===
- Richard St. Simon, The Duke of Balmoral - Co-Owner of the Cantlemere Ranch. A pompous and vain aristocrat with a weakness for gambling. Called "Old Dicky" by his staff behind his back.
- Mr. Edwards - Co-Owner of the Cantlemere Ranch. An overweight, upper-class Bostonian. Just as pompous and vain as the Duke.
- Mr. Brackwell - Co-Owner of the Cantlemere Ranch. Sent by his family to inspect the ranch. Quite taken with the Western lifestyle, he has taken to wearing outlandishly gaudy western clothing.
- Emily - Maid and hand servant to Lady Clara. Given to gossip and flirting.
- Lady Clara - The picture of the perfect High born Lady of Quality

=== Other characters ===
- Jim Weller - An African-American cowboy, friend to the Amlingmeyers. He is rejected by the McPhersons' when they are hiring new employees and turns to bounty hunting.
- "Hungry" Bob Tracy - An escaped convict, wanted for six counts of cannibalism.
- Jack Martin - The local deputy U.S. marshal.

== Release Details ==
- 2006, USA, St. Martin's Minotaur (ISBN 0312347804), Pub Date February 7, 2006, Hardcover
- 2006, USA, Thorndike Press (ISBN 0786285338), Pub Date May 10, 2006, Large Print Hardcover
- 2006, USA, Tantor Media (ISBN 1400102251), Pub Date March 1, 2006, Unabridged Audiobook CD edition
- 2007, USA, St. Martin's Minotaur (ISBN 0312358040), Pub Date February 6, 2007, Softcover

== Reception ==
Holmes on the Range received starred reviews from Booklist and Publishers Weekly, who wrote, "Sherlockians, western fans and mystery lovers who enjoy their whodunits leavened with humor should all be delighted by Hockensmith's captivating debut". They further indicated that "the melding of genres will remind some of the late Bill DeAndrea's western Nero Wolfe pastiches, while the skillful plotting and characterization augur well for the sequel".

Kirkus Reviews called the novel "a winning twist on a proven franchise," noting that the "playful chapter titles add authenticity and flavor".

Publishers Weekly also provided the audiobook a starred review, writing that "narrator William Dufris gives a virtuoso performance". They highlighted how "Dufris creates believable, distinctive voices for a large and colorful cast [...] and does it so well that a listener might well believe he's listening to a full troupe of actors".
