= Steve Hockensmith =

American author (born 1968)

- Born: August 17, 1968 (age 58); Louisville, Kentucky, U.S.
- Occupation: Author
- Children: 2
- Website: www.stevehockensmith.com

Steve Hockensmith (born August 17, 1968) is an American author. He was born in Louisville, Kentucky. He currently lives in California's bay area with his wife, two children, and pet dog.

== Early life and education ==
Hockensmith attended Bridgeport High School and Indiana University Bloomington.

== Career ==
Hockensmith is the author of the Holmes on the Range mystery series. The first book in the series, Holmes on the Range (published in 2006), was a finalist for the Edgar, Shamus and Anthony Awards for Best First Novel.

Several of Hockensmith's short stories have been nominated for awards in the mystery field. He won the Short Mystery Fiction Society's Derringer Award for "Erie's Last Day," published in the May 2000 issue of Alfred Hitchcock's Mystery Magazine (AHMM). Two subsequent Larry Erie stories, "Tricks" (AHMM, August 2004) and "The Big Road" (AHMM, May 2005), were finalists for the Shamus Award for Best Short Story from the Private Eye Writers of America (PWA). "The Big Road" was also nominated for the Anthony and Barry Awards. More recently, a Big Red/Old Red story, "Dear Dr. Watson" (published in the February 2007 EQMM), was a finalist for the Anthony Award.

Hockensmith authored the third book in the Quirk Classics series, Pride and Prejudice and Zombies: Dawn of the Dreadfuls, in 2010, as well as its sequel, Pride and Prejudice and Zombies: Dreadfully Ever After in 2011

== Bibliography ==
=== Novels ===
Title	Pub. date	Notes
Holmes on the Range	2006	first in the series, featuring Big Red & Old Red
On the Wrong Track	2007	part of the Holmes on the Range series
The Black Dove	2008	part of the Holmes on the Range series
The Crack in the Lens	2009	part of the Holmes on the Range series
Pride and Prejudice and Zombies: Dawn of the Dreadfuls	2010	prequel to Pride and Prejudice and Zombies
Naughty: Nine Tales of Christmas Crime	2010	ebook
World's Greatest Sleuth!	2011	part of the Holmes on the Range series
Pride and Prejudice and Zombies: Dreadfully Ever After	2011	sequel to Pride and Prejudice and Zombies
The White Magic Five and Dime: A Tarot Mystery	2014	first in the series
Fool Me Once: A Tarot Mystery	2015	sequel to The White Magic Five and Dime
Give the Devil His Due: A Tarot Mystery	2017	third in the series
The Double-A Western Detective Agency	2018	part of the Holmes on the Range series
Hunters of the Dead	2023	part of the Holmes on the Range series
Strong Medicine	2026	part of the Holmes on the Range series

=== Short stories ===
Title	Publication or Anthology	Pub. date	Notes
Erie's Last Day	Alfred Hitchcock's Mystery Magazine	2000	featuring Larry Erie
Special Delivery	Ellery Queen's Mystery Magazine	Jan 2002	
Dear Mr. Holmes	Ellery Queen's Mystery Magazine	Feb 2003	debut of Big Red & Old Red
Secret Santa	Ellery Queen's Mystery Magazine	Jan 2004	
Tricks	Alfred Hitchcock's Mystery Magazine	2004	featuring Larry Erie
Fred Menace, Commie for Hire	Show Business Is Murder	2004	featuring Fred Menace
Naughty	Ellery Queen's Mystery Magazine	Jan 2005	
Gustav Amlingmeyer, Holmes of the Range	Ellery Queen's Mystery Magazine	Feb 2005	featuring Big Red & Old Red
The Big Road	Alfred Hitchcock's Mystery Magazine	2005	featuring Larry Erie
Naiveté	Ellery Queen's Mystery Magazine	Jan 2006	
Wolves in Winter	Ellery Queen's Mystery Magazine	Feb 2006	featuring Big Red & Old Red
Dear Dr. Watson	Ellery Queen's Mystery Magazine	Feb 2007	featuring Big Red & Old Red
Hidden Gifts	Ellery Queen's Mystery Magazine	Jan 2008	
The Devil's Acre	Ellery Queen's Mystery Magazine	Feb 2008	featuring Big Red & Old Red
Greetings from Purgatory!	Ellery Queen's Mystery Magazine	Feb 2009	featuring Big Red & Old Red
The old Senator	Sherlock Holmes: The American Years	Feb 2010	featuring Sherlock Holmes
An Introduction to Jewish Myth and Mysticism	An Apple for a Creature	Aug 2012	
The Herd	Lightspeed Magazine	Oct 2014	
Do Not Disturb	Ellery Queen's Mystery Magazine	Jun 2019	
The Death and Carnage Boy	Ellery Queen's Mystery Magazine	Jul 2020	
Curious Incidents	Ellery Queen's Mystery Magazine	Dec 2020	
