= Clark and Michael =

- Clark and Michael title screen
- Created by: Clark Duke; Michael Cera
- Directed by: Michael Cera; Clark Duke; Max Winkler
- Starring: Clark Duke; Michael Cera
- Ending theme: "Black Out" by British Sea Power
- Country of origin: United States
- Original language: English
- No. of episodes: 10

Production
- Executive producer: Matt Kaplan
- Producers: Michael Cera; Clark Duke; Seth Grahame-Smith; David Katzenberg; Max Winkler
- Editors: Michael Cera; Taylor Chien; Clark Duke
- Running time: approx. 10 minutes

Original release
- Network: CBS (distributed online)
- Release: May 23 – July 25, 2007

Clark and Michael is a CBS Internet television series created by and starring Clark Duke and Michael Cera. The series takes the form of a mockumentary following Duke and Cera's ambitions to write and sell a pilot for a television series.

== Style ==
Duke and Cera play fictionalized versions of themselves, Cera describing the characters as "more idiotic and more deluded". The series is a low-budget affair, filmed on handheld cameras by friends of the duo. The cameras are acknowledged by Clark, Michael and others, who will sometimes address them or those operating them; in one scene, an upset Michael shouts a cameraman out of the bathroom, after which Clark angrily points out to the crew that their contract states "no bathroom stuff". Boom mics are often visible, and the crew have also intervened in fights between Clark and Michael.

== Plot ==
Clark and Michael's ambition of producing their own television series is stated in the opening of the first episode, and forms the drive of the series. After being turned down initially, the pair come to terms with the fact that success will not be instantaneous, and continue to pursue new opportunities. Though their agent succeeds in scheduling a meeting to discuss their show with another network, Clark's drunken behavior changes their mind about picking up the show. Following this, the pair has a meeting with agent Ramsay, who recommends that Michael be made the "hero" of the series. Bothered by this, Clark reveals an idea for his own series, D.A. Dad, to the crew, and begins pursuing the concept.

Some time later, the pair are watching television together when they see an ad for D.A. Dad. Clark reacts angrily, explaining that the show was his and the concept had been taken and produced by someone else. Michael is hurt that Clark would work separately from him, but the pair eventually reconcile their differences and their arrangement returns to normal. Michael takes up driving lessons, and takes an interest in one of his fellow students. The pair try to get Kenny Loggins to perform the theme song for their show, but can't get in touch with him. Michael only barely passes his driving test, and Clark informs him that he won't be driving his car. Regretting this overreaction, he makes it up to Michael with a game of minigolf. A meeting with another potential network ends poorly, unbeknownst to the two, when their arrogant behavior in general makes a bad impression on the executives. Clark soon makes it into Columbia University, and plans to move to New York City to attend. Yet Clark ultimately decides against university when they achieve their TV show dream, with CBS signing them up (as well as in real life).

== Guest stars ==
Several guest stars have made appearances in the series:

- Some of Michael Cera's former co-stars from Fox's Arrested Development
  - Tony Hale was featured in the first episode as an executive for the fictional ATC Family network, who turned down the pair's concept.
  - Mitch Hurwitz appeared as agent Ramsay, while Clark Duke's attorney, Jerry Lillard, was played by Andy Richter.
  - When Michael attended driving lessons, he was taught by David Cross.
- Eric Wareheim and Tim Heidecker both have made appearances, with Heidecker as a martial arts instructor, and Wareheim's recurring role as their neighbor, Randy.
- Comedian Patton Oswalt appears as a realtor who sells them an office building.
- Jonah Hill (Cera's Superbad co-star) and John Francis Daley appear as a rival television writing team.
- Joe Lo Truglio appears as a deli store employee in episode 8.
- Martin Starr appears as an employee at a fast food restaurant, only in one episode.
