= Pride and Prejudice and Zombies: Dawn of the Dreadfuls =

Book by Steve Hockensmith

- Author: Steve Hockensmith
- Language: English
- Genre: Comic novel, Historical Fiction, Horror, Thriller, Comedy
- Publisher: Quirk Books, Philadelphia
- Publication date: March 23, 2010
- Publication place: United States
- Media type: Print (paperback)
- Pages: 287 pp
- ISBN: 978-1-59474-454-9
- Preceded by: Android Karenina
- Followed by: Pride and Prejudice and Zombies: Dreadfully Ever After

Pride and Prejudice and Zombies: Dawn of the Dreadfuls (2010) is a parody novel by Steve Hockensmith. It is a prequel to Seth Grahame-Smith's 2009 novel Pride and Prejudice and Zombies, focusing on "the early life and training of Elizabeth Bennet, heroine of the earlier Pride and Prejudice and Zombies as she strove to become a gifted zombie hunter, with some mishaps in her early romantic encounters also included". It was first published by Quirk Books on March 23, 2010.

== Plot summary ==
Set four years before the events described in Pride and Prejudice and Zombies, the novel takes place in an alternate universe version of Regency-era England where zombies are a well-known menace spawned by an event known as The Troubles.

After attending a funeral in which a zombie rises from his coffin, Mr. Bennet decides that he must finally keep an old promise to train his five daughters in the art of zombie-killing. To this end, he turns the family's greenhouse into a dojo and hires young martial-arts expert Master Hawksworth to teach the girls. Meanwhile, a scientist named Dr. Keckilpenny arrives in the area with the dream of studying and possibly domesticating the zombies. As the zombie plague continues to spread across England, Hawksworth and Keckilpenny compete for Elizabeth's affections while Mrs. Bennet plots to find suitably wealthy suitors for both Elizabeth and her older sister Jane. In a bid to get reinforcements against the plague, Jane becomes the bodyguard of Lord Lumpley, a fat, lazy nobleman with low moral standards. Meanwhile, Elizabeth and Keckilpenny capture a zombie for further research.

== Reception ==
Booklist gave the novel a favorable review, calling it "a must-read for the growing legion of alternate-Austen fans (including, naturally, everyone who has read Pride and Prejudice and Zombies)".

The A.V. Club gave the novel a grade of "B-", stating that the novel "often succeeds on its own terms" while noting that author Hockensmith "makes no attempt at Jane Austen's style, either for replication or parody", and that the story is "nothing more or less than an adventure story that happens to be set in Regency England".

== See also ==
- List of literary adaptations of Pride and Prejudice
