= Queen Victoria: Demon Hunter =

2009 novel by A. E. Moorat

- First Edition Cover, 2009
- Author: A.E. Moorat
- Language: English
- Genre: Comic novel, historical fiction
- Published: 15 October 2009 Hodder & Stoughton, London
- Publication place: United Kingdom
- Media type: Print (Paperback)
- Pages: 374 pp
- ISBN: 978-1-4447-0026-8
- Followed by: Henry VIII: Wolfman

Queen Victoria: Demon Hunter is a 2009 novel by A. E. Moorat. It is a story based on the life of Queen Victoria, but incorporating a fictional account of her dealings with demons.

== Plot summary ==
Victoria becomes the Queen of the United Kingdom following the death of her uncle William IV in 1837. However, she is soon thrown into a fight she did not expect: a war with demons.

== Historical characters ==
- Queen Victoria: the queen regnant of the United Kingdom of Great Britain and Ireland from 20 June 1837, and the first Empress of India of the British Raj from 1 May 1876 until her death on 22 January 1901.
- Lord Melbourne: Prime Minister of the United Kingdom in 1834 and from 1835 to 1841.
- Maggie Brown: The servant to the Queen.
- Prince Albert: Prince Consort of the United Kingdom from 1840 until his death in 1861.
- John Conroy: A British army officer who became the chief attendant of the Duke and Duchess of Kent, who were the parents of Queen Victoria.

== Fictional characters ==
- Lord Quimby: A lord who has a manservant and who also is bribed.
- Perkins: Manservant to Lord Quimby, who later on in the story becomes a zombie.
- McKenzie: Journalist who bribes Lord Quimby.

== Reception ==
Commending the "beautiful romance" depicted between Victoria and Albert, Library Journal said in its review that "the story, told with delightful, understated British humor, is not for the squeamish... The zombie scenes are especially disgusting, as zombies have appalling table manners".

== See also ==
- Abraham Lincoln, Vampire Hunter
- Henry VIII: Wolfman
