= Seth Grahame-Smith =

American writer

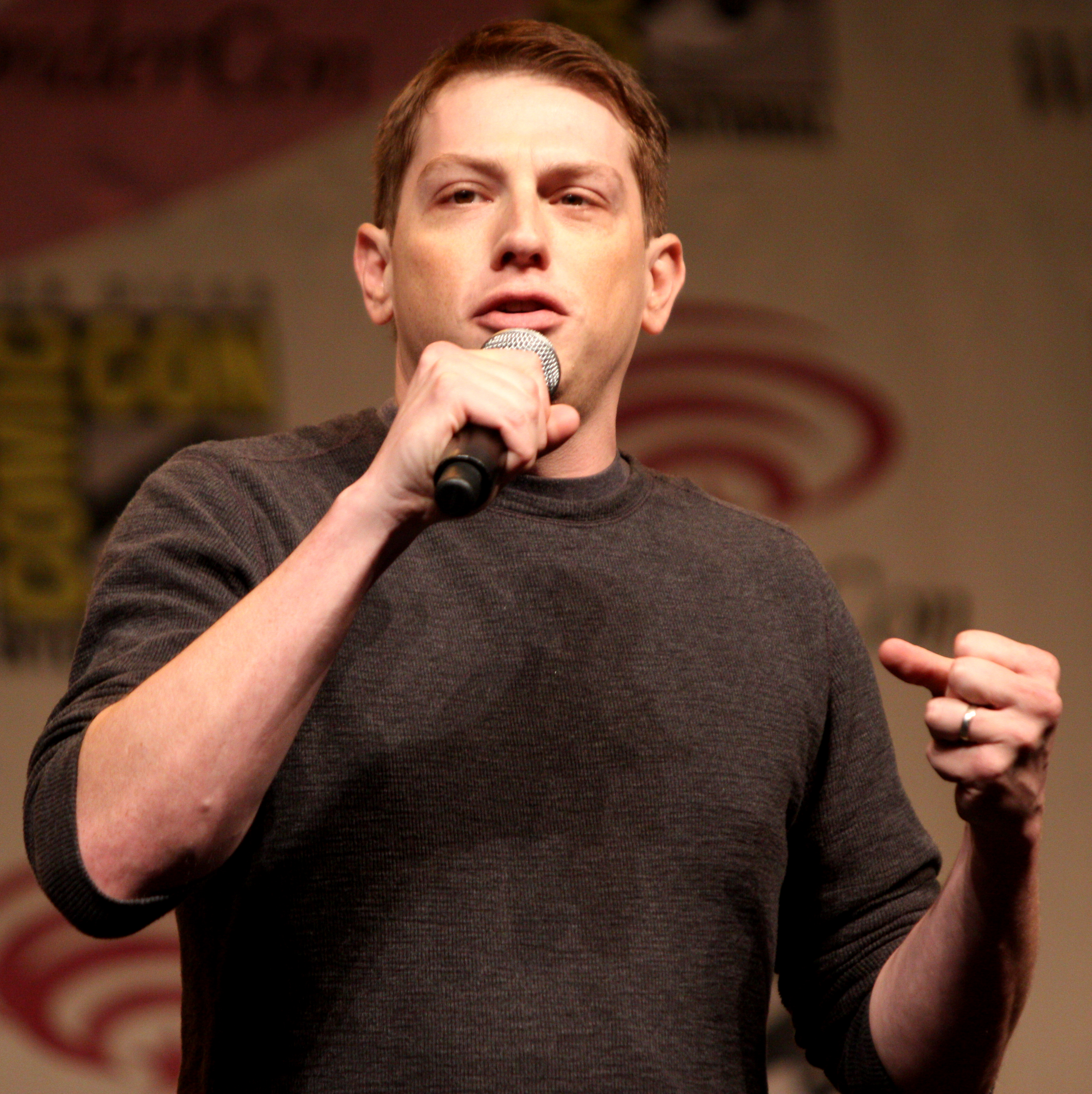
- Grahame-Smith in March 2012
- Born: Seth Jared Greenberg; January 4, 1976 (age 50); Rockville Centre, New York, U.S.
- Education: Emerson College
- Occupations: Novelist; screenwriter; film producer
- Spouse: Erin Stickle (m. 2004)
- Children: 2
- Writing career
- Genres: Comedy, horror fiction, mashup, non-fiction
- Notable works: Pride and Prejudice and Zombies; Abraham Lincoln, Vampire Hunter
- Website: sethgrahamesmith.com

Seth Grahame-Smith (born Seth Jared Greenberg; January 4, 1976) is an American writer and film producer, best known as the author of The New York Times best-selling novels Pride and Prejudice and Zombies and Abraham Lincoln, Vampire Hunter, both of which have been adapted as feature films. Grahame-Smith is also the co-creator, head writer and executive producer of The Hard Times of RJ Berger, a scripted television comedy appearing on MTV. In collaboration with David Katzenberg, his partner in Katzsmith Productions, Grahame-Smith is currently developing a number of projects for television and film.

== Early life ==
Grahame-Smith was born in Rockville Centre, New York, the son of Deborah Ann (née Williams) and Barry Michael Greenberg. He eventually grew up in Weston and Bethel, Connecticut, where he attended Bethel High School. His parents divorced when he was a child. Subsequently, his mother changed his surname to "Grahame", after author Kenneth Grahame, and later added the surname "Smith", from her remarriage. Grahame-Smith attended an Episcopal church after his mother's remarriage (his father was Jewish). His mother was a literary editor and his stepfather was a rare books dealer.

== Career ==
=== Literature ===
Grahame-Smith's first widely published book was The Big Book of Porn: A Penetrating Look at the World of Dirty Movies, a non-fiction history of the erotic art form published in 2005. The next year, Grahame-Smith published The Spider-Man Handbook: The Ultimate Training Manual, an examination of Marvel Comics' Spider-Man, with an introduction by Stan Lee. In 2007, Grahame-Smith wrote How to Survive a Horror Movie: All the Skills to Dodge the Kills, a tongue-in-cheek guide to help readers escape situations most often shown in horror films. The book's introduction was written by horror film director Wes Craven. Grahame-Smith's next book was the satirical Pardon My President: Fold-and-Mail Apologies for 8 Years, a collection of letters addressed to various parties intended to apologize for the wrongs they had suffered under the administration of George W. Bush.

The idea for Grahame-Smith's next novel, Pride and Prejudice and Zombies, came from his editor at Quirk Books, Jason Rekulak. Using Jane Austen's classic novel Pride and Prejudice as a platform, Rekulak suggested that Grahame-Smith mix a zombie plot into the public domain novel. Enamored of the idea, Grahame-Smith immediately began working on the novel, first by reading Pride and Prejudice and then by inserting the gruesome zombie elements, a process he has described as similar to microsurgery. Though Quirk Books was initially reluctant to publish the book in fear of alienating Austen's fans, the novel went to press in 2009, with modest sales expectations. In the weeks prior to the release, however, the book's popularity swelled dramatically as the cover and title of the novel circulated the internet. Anticipation for the book grew so rapidly that in its first week of release, Pride and Prejudice and Zombies surged to No. 3 on the New York Times Best Seller list. Since that time, the novel has sold over a million copies and been translated into over 20 languages.

Building on the success of Pride and Prejudice and Zombies, Grahame-Smith wrote another mash-up, Abraham Lincoln, Vampire Hunter. As the title suggests, this book traces Abraham Lincoln's life from childhood through assassination, relying upon his "secret diaries" to reveal his central role in a worldwide struggle against vampirism. Released on March 2, 2010, this novel debuted at No. 4 on The New York Times Best Seller list of hardcover fiction.

In addition to writing novels, Grahame-Smith made his debut as a comic book writer on Marvel Zombies Return: Hulk with artist Richard Elson.

Grahame-Smith's novel Unholy Night was released on April 10, 2012. It depicts Balthazar, Gaspar, and Melchyor, the Magi of popular tradition, as criminals who ultimately visit the infant Jesus. Herod the Great, Augustus Caesar, Pontius Pilate, and the Virgin Mary appear as supporting characters.

=== Film ===
Two of Grahame-Smith's best-selling books were made into feature films. Grahame-Smith adapted his book, Abraham Lincoln: Vampire Hunter, for the screen, for producers Tim Burton and Timur Bekmambetov. In 2011, Pride and Prejudice and Zombies was optioned by Lionsgate Entertainment, with Natalie Portman producing, and David O. Russell initially set to adapt and direct. Russell later left the project. In 2013, a new group of producers, including Portman, hired Burr Steers to direct. Lily James and Bella Heathcote were chosen to star as the oldest Bennett sisters. Pride and Prejudice and Zombies was released on February 5, 2016.

Grahame-Smith wrote the script for Tim Burton's Dark Shadows, the film adaptation of the 1960s soap opera, replacing longtime Burton scribe John August. Grahame-Smith produced the film adaptation of the Mark Bianculli and Jeff Richard spec script The Waiting. Smith polished the script for Fantastic Four. In 2013, Smith was tapped to write and produce a third Gremlins film. In January 2015, it was announced that he will write the screenplay for a sequel to Beetlejuice, and that the Gremlins project was put on hold. The remake Something Wicked This Way Comes is set for his directorial debut. Smith produced the theatrical film versions of Stephen King's It: It, which was released in September 2017, and It Chapter Two, released two years later, and is producing the feature-length follow-up to the 1980s' action-comedy homage film short titled Kung Fury in 2018.

=== Television ===
After receiving a degree in film from Emerson College, Grahame-Smith moved to Los Angeles, where he wrote and produced for several television series, including Vendettas and the History Channel's History's Mysteries. Building on these experiences, Grahame-Smith was hired to produce an innovative CBS online series, Clark and Michael, starring Clark Duke, Michael Cera, David Cross, Patton Oswalt, and Andy Richter.

While working on Clark and Michael, Grahame-Smith met another producer on the series, David Katzenberg (son of Jeffrey), who would become his partner in KatzSmith Productions. Under the KatzSmith banner, Grahame-Smith and Katzenberg created, wrote, and produced a scripted comedy for MTV called The Hard Times of RJ Berger, which follows an awkward high-school loser who gains notoriety for his extraordinary endowment.

In October 2020, it was announced that Grahame-Smith would be serving as showrunner for an upcoming HBO Max series based on Green Lantern. He is also set to write the series alongside Marc Guggenheim. In October 2022 it was announced that the show would take a new direction and that he had opted not to stay with the new project.

== Personal life ==
Grahame-Smith received a degree in film from Emerson College. He currently lives in Los Angeles with his wife, Erin, and sons, Joshua and Jacob.

== Bibliography ==
- Big Book of Porn: A Penetrating Look at the World of Dirty Movies (2005)
- The Spider-Man Handbook: The Ultimate Training Manual (2006)
- How to Survive a Horror Movie: All the Skills to Dodge the Kills (2007)
- Pardon My President: Fold-and-Mail Apologies for 8 Years (2008)
- Pride and Prejudice and Zombies (2009)
- Abraham Lincoln, Vampire Hunter (2010)
- Unholy Night (2012)
- The Last American Vampire (2015)

== Filmography ==
=== Film ===
Year	Title	Credited as		Notes
Year	Title	Writer	Producer	Notes
2000	Housebound	No	No	Clapper loader
2012	Dark Shadows	Yes	No	Co-story writer with John August
2012	Abraham Lincoln: Vampire Hunter	Yes	Executive	Based on his novel
2015	Fantastic Four	Uncredited	No	Script revision
2016	Pride and Prejudice and Zombies	No	No	Credited on-screen for being based on his novel
2017	The Lego Batman Movie	Yes	No	Co-screenwriter with Chris McKenna, Erik Sommers, Jared Stern and John Whittington
2017	It	No	Yes	
2017	The Lego Ninjago Movie	No	Executive	
2019	Child's Play	No	Yes	
2019	It Chapter Two	No	Executive	
2023	The Flash	Additional	No	Additional literary material
2024	Beetlejuice Beetlejuice	Story	Executive	
2025	Now You See Me: Now You Don't	Yes	No	
TBA	Kung Fury 2	No	Yes	Completed

=== Television ===
Year	Title	Credited as			Notes
Year	Title	Director	Writer	Producer	Notes
2000–2001	History's Mysteries	No	Yes	Coordinating	Documentary series; 2 episodes
2001	The Most	No	Yes	No	Miniseries
2007	Clark and Michael	No	No	Yes	Also appears as "Producer" in 1 episode
2009	His Name Was Jason: 30 Years of Friday the 13th	No	No	No	Himself as person
2010–2011	The Hard Times of RJ Berger	Yes	Yes	Executive	Also creator; Director on 2 episodes; Writer on 4 episodes; Producer on 12 episodes
2015	87th Academy Awards	No	Yes	No	Awards show presentation
2021	Just Beyond	No	Yes	Executive	Also creator and showrunner Writer on 2 episodes
