= Nick Mamatas =

American novelist

- Mamatas at World Fantasy Convention 2026
- Born: February 20, 1972 (age 54); Long Island, New York
- Education: Stony Brook University; New School University; Western Connecticut State University (MFA)
- Occupations: Novelist; short story author; essayist; editor
- Writing career
- Genres: Horror, fantasy, science fiction, personal essay

Nick Mamatas (Greek: Νίκος Μαμματάς) (born February 20, 1972) is an American horror, science fiction and fantasy author and editor for Haikasoru's line of translated Japanese science fiction novels for Viz Media. His fiction has been nominated for a number of awards, including several Bram Stoker Awards. He has also been recognised for his editorial work with a Bram Stoker Award, as well as World Fantasy Award and Hugo Award nominations. He funded his early writing career by producing term papers for college students, which gained him some notoriety when he described this experience in an essay for Drexel University's online magazine The Smart Set.

== Biography ==
Nick Mamatas was born on Long Island, New York and attended Stony Brook University and New School University. He is also a graduate of the MFA program in creative and professional writing at Western Connecticut State University, which he attended only after publishing a number of books, short stories, and articles. During his early writing career he wrote not just nonfiction but also worked in an essay mill as a ghostwriter for college students needing term papers, an experience he later described in an essay called "The Term Paper Artist". His non-fiction work has appeared in Razor Magazine, The Village Voice, and various disinformation books and BenBella Books' Smart Pop Books anthologies. His parents are Greeks from the island of Icaria.

== Career and themes ==
Mamatas is most known for his horror and dark fiction but claims broad influences. Writer Laird Barron described the short fictions in You Might Sleep... as running "the gamut of science fiction, fantasy, metafiction, horror, generic lit, to the realms of the effectively unclassifiable".

The Internet Review of Science Fiction, reviewing You Might Sleep, contends that "J.D. Salinger [is] an obvious but unacknowledged influence" and also compares Mamatas' work to "Lewis Carroll with an ISP, Mishima hammering out his death poem on a BlackBerry or Harlan Ellison hyped up on crystal meth..." while suggesting a certain immaturity to Mamatas's themes: "Despite his tremendous gifts, Mamatas dares little. One wonders how he would handle more profound materials, how his narrative sorcery might encompass (for example) bereavement, real tragedy or loss of self through enlightenment or love."

A thematic touchstone for Mamatas is H.P. Lovecraft. His novel Move Under Ground, which combines Lovecraftian and Beat themes, was declared one of the best Cthulhu Mythos stories not written by Lovecraft by Kenneth Hite in the book Cthulhu 101. Mark Halcomb of the Village Voice reviewed the book and its peculiar meshing of Lovecraft and Kerouac, writing, in part, "In fact, Kerouac's 'bebop prosody' and the Cthulhu mythos dovetail nicely, and what seems at first like literary stunt-casting actually gives Mamatas room to recast the Beats' fall from grace in fanciful terms unhindered by their tricky psychology, the strictures of reality and realism—or lingering platitudes." Publishers Weekly reviewed Move Under Ground, discussing the novel's "credible pastiche" of Kerouac's voice and declared the book "sophisticated, progressive horror..."

A number of his short works, such as the novelette Real People Slash and the flash fiction "And Then And Then And Then", also explicitly combine Lovecraftian themes with the voices of non-fantastical literature. The short story "That of Which We Speak When We Speak of the Unspeakable", first published in the anthology Lovecraft Unbound is a pastiche of Lovecraft and several of the works of Raymond Carver. The Damned Highway combines a character based heavily on Hunter S. Thompson and Lovecraftian themes.

Satire is also a significant element of Mamatas's fiction. Ed Park, writing for his online The Los Angeles Times review column, described Mamatas's Under My Roof—a short novel about the formation of a microstate on Long Island—as an "accurate, fast-moving satire that transcends mere target shooting by virtue of its narrator, Daniel’s 12-year-old son Herbie". A starred review in Publishers Weekly for the same title also highlighted the satirical elements in the work, declaring: "A big-bang ending caps the fast-paced novel, and there's much fun to be had watching Mamatas...merrily skewer his targets."

Mamatas's nonfiction work includes essays on publishing, digital culture, and politics. His Village Voice piece on the Otherkin phenomenon is cited as one of the earliest national publications on the subculture. His essay about his settlement with the RIAA for file-sharing has been cited in several law reviews, as it is a relatively rare first-person account of the process of settlement with the RIAA. Essays from The Smart Set, Village Voice, The Writer and Tim Pratt's fanzine Flytrap were compiled, along with original material, into the writing handbook Starve Better in 2011, and published by Apex Publications His essay "The Term Paper Artist" originally from The Smart Set, about his experiences as an academic ghostwriter for pay, has been discussed on National Public Radio and reprinted in a pair of textbooks, both published by Nelson Education.

== Major works ==
=== Novels ===
- Northern Gothic - Soft Skull Press (2001) ISBN 978-1887128742
- Move Under Ground - Night Shade Books (2005) ISBN 978-1892389916
- Under My Roof - Soft Skull Shortlit (2007) ISBN 978-1933368436
- Sensation - PM Press (2011) ISBN 978-1604863543
- The Damned Highway (with Brian Keene ) - Dark Horse (2011) ISBN 978-1595826855
- Bullettime - ChiZine Publications (2012) ISBN 9781926851716
- Love is the Law - Dark Horse Books (2013) ISBN 978-1616552220
- The Last Weekend: A Novel of Zombies, Booze, and Power Tools - Night Shade Books (2016 reprint) (2014) ISBN 978-1597808422
- I Am Providence - Night Shade Books (2016) ISBN 978-1597808354
- Sabbath - Tor Books (2019) ISBN 978-1250170118
- The Second Shooter - Rebellion Publishing (2021) ISBN 978-1786184443
- Kalivas! Or, Another Tempest - Clash Books (2025) ISBN 978-1-960988-79-9

=== Short story collections ===
- 3000 MPH In Every Direction At Once: Stories And Essays - Wildside Press (2003) ISBN 978-1930997318
- You Might Sleep... - Prime Books (2009) ISBN 978-0809573127
- The Nickronomicon - Innsmouth Free Press (2014) ISBN 978-1927990087
- The People's Republic of Everything - Tachyon Publications (2018) ISBN 978-1616963002

=== Anthologies edited by ===
- The Urban Bizarre - Prime (2004) ISBN 978-1930997394
- Spicy Slipstream Stories (with Jay Lake) - Lethe Press (2008) ISBN 978-1590210253
- Haunted Legends (with Ellen Datlow) - Tor Books (2010) ISBN 9780765323002
- The Future is Japanese (with Masumi Washington) - Haikasoru (2012) ISBN 978-1421542232
- Phantasm Japan:Fantasies Light and Dark, From and About Japan (with Masumi Washington) - Haikasoru (2014) ISBN 978-1421571744
- Hanzai Japan:Fantastical, Futuristic Stories of Crime From and About Japan (with Masumi Washington) - Haikasoru (2015) ISBN 978-1421580258
- Mixed Up: Cocktail Recipes (and Flash Fiction) for the Discerning Drinker (and Reader) (with Molly Tanzer) - Skyhorse Publishing (2017) ISBN 978-1510718036
- 120 Murders: Dark Fiction Inspired by the Alternative Era Ruadán Books (2025) ISBN 979-8991258739

=== Non-fiction ===
- Kwangju Diary (with Jae-Eui Lee & Kap Su Seol) - University of California, Los Angeles (1999) ISBN 978-1883191030
- Starve Better:Surviving the Endless Horror of the Writing Life - Apex Book Company (2011) ISBN 978-0984553587
- Insults Every Man Should Know (Stuff You Should Know) - Quirk Books (2011) ISBN 978-1594745249
- Quotes Every Man Should Know (Stuff You Should Know) - Quirk Books (2013) ISBN 978-1594746369
- The Battle Royale Slam Book:Essays on the Cult Classic by Koushun Takami (with Masumi Washington) - Haikasoru (2014) ISBN 978-1421565996

=== Poetry ===
- Cthulhu Senryu Prime - (2006) ISBN 978-0809562411

=== Work as editor ===
- Phantom Magazine, Issue #0 (November 2005)
- Clarkesworld Magazine (August 2006-August 2008)
- Viz Media (August 2008–May 2019)

== Personal life ==
Mamatas is a student of Chen-style tai chi. In 2012, he won a push hands competition at the 3rd Annual "Golden Gate" Chinese Martial Arts Championship in San Francisco, California. In 2015, he won the silver medal in push hands at the twenty-third Berkeley Chinese Martial Arts Tournament. In 2019, he came in second in the 19th annual Mokomoko Invitational's gi-sumo competition, in the 180+ pound division.
