= The Amazing Screw-On Head =

Screw-On Head
- Art by Mike Mignola

Publication information
- Publisher: Dark Horse Comics
- First appearance: The Amazing Screw-On Head
- Created by: Mike Mignola

In-story information
- Abilities: Can have his head removed and reattached to any one of a number of robotic bodies, some of which possess such features as projectile grenade fists.

The Amazing Screw-On Head is a one-shot comic book written and drawn by Mike Mignola and published by Dark Horse Comics in 2002, starring the character of the same name. The Amazing Screw-On Head stars a robot living during the Lincoln administration whose head can be attached to different bodies with different tactical abilities, and who functions as an agent of the U.S. government.

The idea for the character was inspired by action figures, particularly Batman ones, which seemed to Mignola to be the same figurines with different paint jobs. Mignola imagined a robot with a head that screwed onto different bodies to suit the occasion, hence "Screw-on Head". An animated pilot, based on the plot of the comic, was produced by the Sci-Fi Channel in 2006, with Bryan Fuller as writer and executive producer and Chris Prynoski as director.

== Plot ==
=== Comic ===
Screw-On Head is an agent for President Abraham Lincoln. He is summoned by Lincoln to track down Emperor Zombie, an undead occultist and originally a groundskeeper at Hyde Park. Zombie and his henchmen, the vampire Madam and scientist Dr. Snap, have stolen an ancient manuscript. This will allow him access to the temple of Gung, a warlord who nearly conquered the world over ten thousand years ago with supernatural power gained from "a fabulous melon-sized jewel", which Zombie obviously plans to use for himself.

With the aid of his manservant, Mr. Groin, and dog Mr. Dog, Screw-On Head manages to track down Zombie, but not before the villain and his henchmen find the treasure: instead of a jewel, the tomb contains a turnip with "a small parallel universe" inside. Zombie unleashes the Demigod within, but Screw-On Head manages to defeat it in combat.

=== TV pilot ===
The 22-minute pilot differs from the comic mainly in that the characters are fleshed out with backstories. Rather than a master of languages, Emperor Zombie (David Hyde Pierce) is the first of Screw-On Head's (Paul Giamatti) manservants, who has turned to evil despite Screw-On Head's advice. Out of revenge for his first defeat, Zombie developed what he refers to as a "petty vengeance fetish", killing the seven replacement servants after him, and before Mr. Groin (Patton Oswalt), in gruesome ways. The pilot also featured Molly Shannon, Mindy Sterling, and Corey Burton in various roles as well. On August 20, 2006, The Amazing Screw-On Head TV pilot was aired online at scifi.com with a survey to decide whether or not the show went to series. The series was not picked up by the Sci-Fi Channel. The pilot was released on DVD on February 6, 2007.

== Awards ==
The Amazing Screw-On Head won the 2003 Eisner Award for Best Humor Publication.

== See also ==
- Abraham Lincoln, Vampire Hunter
