= List of presidents of the United States with facial hair =

The majority of presidents of the United States have been clean-shaven, including the Founding Fathers. Between 1861 and 1913, all but two presidents (Andrew Johnson and William McKinley) wore either beards or mustaches during their tenure in office. Since 1913, all presidents have been clean-shaven except for Harry S. Truman, who famously stopped shaving during a two week vacation in Key West, after his hard-fought election victory in 1948, but was clean-shaven upon his return to Washington.

== Overview ==
John Quincy Adams (1825–1829) was the first U.S. president to have notable facial hair, with long sideburns. But the first major departure from the tradition of clean-shaven chief executives was Abraham Lincoln (1861–1865), who was supposedly (and famously) influenced by a letter received from an eleven-year-old girl named Grace Bedell, to start growing a beard to improve his chances of being elected. After Lincoln, all but two presidents over the next 48 years sported some form of facial hair; the exceptions being Andrew Johnson (1865–1869) and William McKinley (1897–1901).

Facial hair fell out of favor for health reasons, as described on the PBS website pertaining to a documentary on tuberculosis: "Most men at the turn of the [twentieth] century featured stylish beards or mustaches, but showing off a smooth face became a new trend once public health officials maintained that men could transmit dangerous infectious particles through the scruff of their facial hair. An editorial in a 1903 Harper's Weekly stated, "Now that consumption is no longer consumption, but tuberculosis, and is not hereditary but infectious… the theory of science is that the beard is infected with the germs of tuberculosis." Ultimately, the clean-shaven look became a symbol of the new middle-class man during the period that Harper's Weekly labeled "the revolt against the whisker."

The most recent president to have had facial hair was William Howard Taft (1909–1913). President Harry S. Truman briefly grew a mustache and goatee (which he jokingly referred to as a "Jeff Davis") while vacationing in Key West, Florida, after the 1948 presidential election.

The last major candidate from any party to have a beard was Charles Evans Hughes, who was defeated at the 1916 presidential election. The last major party candidate for the presidency to have any facial hair was Thomas E. Dewey, who had a mustache, and was defeated at both the 1944 and 1948 presidential elections. Some pundits even claimed that public disapproval of Dewey's mustache may have contributed to his two electoral defeats.

Social scientists have researched the effect of facial hair on the electability of presidential candidates, and as of 2010 currently consider facial hair to have a negative effect on candidates. The existence of facial hair on potential presidential candidates is regularly noted (albeit somewhat jokingly) as a harmful factor.

Following is a list of American presidents who had facial hair at any time during their tenure.

== Presidents who had facial hair during their presidency ==
No.	Portrait	Name (birth–death)	Years served	Political party	Beard	Mustache	Sideburns	Time period	Color
6		John Quincy Adams (1767–1848)	1825–1829	Democratic-Republican/National Republican	No	No	Yes	since 1811	Light brown, turned white before elected
8		Martin Van Buren (1782–1862)	1837–1841	Democratic	No	No	Yes	since 1807	White, originally red or reddish-blond
12		Zachary Taylor (1784–1850)	1849–1850	Whig	No	No	Yes	since 1815	Grey
16		Abraham Lincoln (1809–1865)	1861–1865	Republican/National Union	Yes	No	—N/a	since 1860	Black
18		Ulysses S. Grant (1822–1885)	1869–1877	Republican	Yes	Yes	—N/a	since 1852	Light brown, turned grey in office
19		Rutherford B. Hayes (1822–1893)	1877–1881	Republican	Yes	Yes	—N/a	since 1854	Blond
20		James A. Garfield (1831–1881)	1881	Republican	Yes	Yes	—N/a	since 1850	Light brown
21		Chester A. Arthur (1829–1886)	1881–1885	Republican	No	Yes	Yes	since 1847	Brown
22/24		Grover Cleveland (1837–1908)	1885–1889; 1893–1897	Democratic	No (Note: Grover Cleveland had a full beard at some point during the 1860s (sometime after 1862), but shaved his beard and grew his moustache sometime around the 1870s or 1880s.)	Yes	No	since 1859	Brown
23		Benjamin Harrison (1833–1901)	1889–1893	Republican	Yes	Yes	—N/a	since 1849	Blond
26		Theodore Roosevelt (1858–1919)	1901–1909	Republican	No	Yes	No	since 1880	Red
27		William Howard Taft (1857–1930)	1909–1913	Republican	No	Yes	No	since the 1880s	White
33		Harry S. Truman (1884–1972)	1945–1953	Democratic	Yes (Note: Truman had facial hair for a brief period of time in 1948 which he nicknamed the "Jeff Davis".)	Yes	No	For a brief period in the 1910s, and in 1948.	Grey

== Presidents who had facial hair but not during their presidency ==
No.	Portrait	Name (birth–death)	Years served	Political party	Beard	Mustache	Sideburns	Time period
25		William McKinley (1843–1901)	1897–1901	Republican	Yes (a goatee)	Yes	No	1865
28		Woodrow Wilson (1856–1924)	1913–1921	Democratic	No	Yes	Yes	1880s
29		Warren G. Harding (1865–1923)	1921–1923	Republican	No	Yes	No	1880s
31		Herbert Hoover (1874–1964)	1929–1933	Republican	Yes (partial)	Yes	No	late 1890s
42		Bill Clinton (b. 1946)	1993–2001	Democratic	Yes	Yes	—N/a	1972
46		Joe Biden (b. 1942)	2021–2025	Democratic	Yes	Yes	—N/a	1966
