= Abraham Lincoln, Vampire Hunter (novel) =

2010 fiction novel

Abraham Lincoln: Vampire Hunter
- First edition cover
- Author: Seth Grahame-Smith
- Language: English
- Genre: Comic novel, horror, historical, thriller
- Published: March 2, 2010, Grand Central Publishing, New York
- Publication place: United States
- Media type: Print (Hardcover, Paperback) e-Book (Kindle, Apple iBooks); Audio Book (CD)
- Pages: 336 pp
- ISBN: 978-0-446-56308-6
- OCLC: 458890478

Abraham Lincoln: Vampire Hunter is a biographical action horror mashup novel by Seth Grahame-Smith, released on March 2, 2010, through New York–based publishing company Grand Central Publishing.

== Plot summary ==
The journal-style book is written as a partial "secret" diary of Abraham Lincoln, kept by the 16th President of the United States and given to the author by a vampire named Henry Sturges. Years later, the manuscript is found in a five-and-dime store in the town of Rhinebeck, New York.

At the age of eleven, Abraham Lincoln learns from his father Thomas that vampires are real. A drunken Thomas explains that a vampire killed Abraham's grandfather in 1786. Abraham's mother, Nancy, also succumbed not to milk sickness but rather to being given a "fool's dose" of vampire blood, the result of Thomas's failure to repay a debt. Lincoln vows to kill as many vampires as he can. A year later, he lures the vampire responsible for Nancy's death to the family farm and kills it with a homemade stake.

In 1825, Lincoln learns of a possible vampire attack along the Ohio River and investigates, but quickly proves no match for the vampire and is nearly killed. He is saved by the intervention of the vampire Henry Sturges, who nurses Lincoln back to health and explains some of the nature of vampirism, emphasizing that some vampires are good, such as he, and others are evil. Lincoln spends the summer with Henry sharpening his senses and being trained as an expert vampire hunter, with Henry revealing that he was turned by the same vampire responsible for wiping out the Roanoke Colony of 1587. When Lincoln departs weeks later, Henry begins mailing him the names and locations of evil vampires; Abraham tracks them down and kills them.

As a young adult, Lincoln and a friend travel down the Mississippi River to New Orleans on a flatboat to sell some goods. Here, Lincoln befriends Edgar Allan Poe, who is also aware of vampires, and witnesses a slave auction. Lincoln follows a slave buyer and his new slaves back to a plantation and discovers that the buyer is a vampire―the slaves are to be used not for labor but for food. Lincoln believes that vampires will continue to exist in America as long as they can easily buy their victims in this manner, and so to end slavery is to end the scourge of vampires. To this end, Lincoln becomes an abolitionist. Returning to his home in New Salem, Lincoln begins his business and political careers by day, continuing to track down the vampires in Henry's letters at night. His life is once again tinged by tragedy when his fiancée Ann Rutledge is attacked and murdered by her ex-fiancé John McNamar, now a vampire living in New York City. With Henry's help, Lincoln catches McNamar and kills him, but decides to give up vampire hunting and instead concentrate on his daytime pursuits. Lincoln marries Mary Todd, begins to raise a family, starts a law firm and is elected to the U.S. House of Representatives.

Lincoln reunites with Poe in Washington, who explains that vampires were driven from their ancestral homes in Europe in the 17th century due to public outcry over the bloody atrocities of Elizabeth Báthory, later helping the United States gain its independence due to the lucrative slave trade. Poe warns that if the vampires are left unchecked, they will eventually seek to enslave all Americans, Black and White alike. Poe is later found murdered in Baltimore, the victim of a vampire attack. In 1857, Henry summons Lincoln to New York City. Here, Lincoln and fellow vampire slayer William Seward meet a group of good vampires known as the Union, who inform them that vampires in the South intend to start a civil war in order to conquer the north and enslave the entire country. Lincoln runs for the U.S. Senate and debates with Stephen A. Douglas, an ally of the Southern vampires, in what become known as the Lincoln–Douglas debates. Lincoln loses but gains a great deal of publicity and respect, allowing him to capture the Republican Party nomination for President of the United States and then the office itself, as secretly orchestrated by the Union.

Lincoln's election triggers the secession of the Southern slave states and the start of the American Civil War. His former opponent Douglas sides with him, regretting his previous alliance with vampires, but is later murdered for his betrayal. Early battles, such as the First Battle of Bull Run, go poorly for the Union troops after they are attacked by Confederate vampires. Lincoln decides that the best way to defeat the vampires is to eliminate their food source and starve them out, leading to him announcing the Emancipation Proclamation to encourage slaves to fight back; this begins to turn the tide of the war. In 1862, a vampire sneaks onto the White House lawn and murders Lincoln's 11-year old son, Willie. Henry offers to turn Willie into a vampire so that he will "live" again, but an enraged Lincoln attacks him before banishing him and all other vampires from the White House, declaring he will never see another for as long as he lives.

The Civil War ends with the Confederacy's defeat. Lincoln receives reports that the vampires in the South are fleeing to Asia and South America in the wake of the slave system's collapse. Happy for the first time in years, he attends a play at Ford's Theater, only to be assassinated by John Wilkes Booth, a vampire. Booth expects the South to rally around Lincoln's death, but instead finds himself shunned and hiding in a Virginia barn as Union troops arrive to arrest him. Henry arrives and confronts Booth inside the barn, killing him. Lincoln's body is later brought by a funeral train back to Springfield, Illinois, where Henry stands guard.

In 1963, Henry and Lincoln attend Martin Luther King Jr.'s "I Have a Dream" speech, with Lincoln writing about spending the previous night at the White House as a guest of John F. Kennedy, and how the monument dedicated to him gives him "no shortage of discomfort". Henry had used his powers to turn Lincoln into a vampire, believing that "some men are just too interesting to die".

== Reception ==
The Los Angeles Times gave Abraham Lincoln, Vampire Hunter a positive review, noting that "a writer who can transform the greatest figure from 19th-century American history into the star of an original vampire tale with humor, heart and bite is a rare find indeed".

Time magazine gave the novel a mixed review, calling author Grahame-Smith "a lively, fluent writer with a sharp sense of tone and pace", but finding the novel "a little too neat" and noting that "once the connection is made, it feels obvious, and neither slavery nor vampirism reveals anything in particular about the other. One could imagine a richer, subtler treatment of the subject, in which the two horrors multiply each other rather than cancel each other out".

== Film adaptation ==
20th Century Fox produced a film adaptation, released June 22, 2012. Timur Bekmambetov directed the film, Tim Burton produced along with Bekmambetov and Jim Lemley, and Benjamin Walker starred as Abraham Lincoln.

== Sequel ==
A sequel, titled The Last American Vampire and focusing on Henry Sturges's experiences during many major events of the 20th century, was released on January 13, 2015.

== See also ==
- Mashup novel
- The Amazing Screw-On Head, a comic book and cartoon involving Abraham Lincoln and vampires
