= Full Throttle =

Full Throttle as a proper noun is an allusion to wide open throttle (full throttle) on an engine. It may refer to:

== Video games ==
- Full Throttle (1984 video game), a 1984 video game released by Micromega
- Full Throttle: All-American Racing, a 1994 racing game for the Super NES
- Full Throttle (1995 video game), a 1995 video game released by LucasArts
- American Chopper 2: Full Throttle, a 2005 video game based on the American Chopper TV series
- Top Speed (video game), a 1987 video game by Taito also known as Full Throttle

== Film ==
- Charlie's Angels: Full Throttle, a 2003 American film
- Full Throttle (film), a 1995 Hong Kong film
- Full Throttle a 1995 film about Tim Birkin

== Music ==
- "Full Throttle", a song by Nebula from the 1999 double EP Nebula/Lowrider

== Other ==
- Full Throttle (drink), an energy drink from The Coca-Cola Company
- Full Throttle (roller coaster), a roller coaster at Six Flags Magic Mountain
- NHRA Full Throttle Drag Racing Series, National Hot Rod Association-sanctioned drag racing championship
- Full Throttle Saloon, an American reality television series airing on the truTV network
- Full Throttle, a 2019 collection of novelettes and short stories by Joe Hill (writer)

== See also ==
- Throttle (disambiguation)
