= Keith Bunin =

American dramatist and screenwriter (born c. 1971)

Keith Bunin (born c. 1971) is an American dramatist and screenwriter. His plays include The Credeaux Canvas, The World Over, and The Busy World is Hushed, all of which have been produced by Playwrights Horizons.

== Life and career ==
Bunin was born in Poughkeepsie, New York. The son of "a half-Jewish father [and] a Catholic mother," he was first "raised in the Episcopal Church," then attended Oakwood Friends School, a Quaker prep school. He ascribes his religious viewpoints, as manifested in works such as The Busy World is Hushed, to this "polyglot religious" upbringing. He moved to New York to attend film school at NYU, then graduated from Goddard College and received a master's degree from Columbia University.

In his 2002 review of The Credeaux Canvas, Alvin Klein of The New York Times called Bunin "a brainy young playwright with the mighty mission of combatting mindlessness" and said his "works reveal a boundless sense of wonder".

Bunin's play The Coast Starlight premiered at La Jolla Playhouse in 2019 and was subsequently staged by Lincoln Center in 2023. The 2023 Lortel Awards recognized Mia Barron as "Outstanding Featured Performer in a Play" for her performance as Liz in the New York production.

Bunin wrote the "Oliver" episodes for season 2 of the HBO series In Treatment, as well as the screenplay for the 2013 film Horns, based on the novel by Joe Hill. In 2012 it was reported that Philip Seymour Hoffman had agreed to direct Bunin's screenplay, Ezekiel Moss, which had been included on the 2011 "Black List" of most promising unproduced screenplays.

Bunin's screenplay for Pixar's Onward (co-written with Dan Scanlon and Jason Headley) earned a nomination for Best Writing: Feature from the 2021 Annie Awards. Bunin also shares story credit on Netflix's animated film Nimona (2023).
