= The New Dead =

2010 anthology edited by Christopher Golden

- Cover
- Authors: Edited by Christopher Golden
- Cover artist: Per Haagensen
- Language: English
- Genre: Horror, post-apocalyptic fiction
- Published: 2010 (St. Martin's Press)
- Publication place: United States
- Media type: Print (hardback & paperback), e-book,
- Pages: 384
- ISBN: 978-0-312-55971-7

The New Dead: A Zombie Anthology is an anthology of zombie short stories edited by Christopher Golden. The stories contained in it were written by authors including Max Brooks, son of Mel Brooks and author of World War Z and The Zombie Survival Guide, and Joe Hill, son of Stephen King, author of Heart-Shaped Box and writer of Locke & Key.

== Contents ==
- "Lazarus" by John Connolly
- "What Maisie Knew" by David Liss
- "Copper" by Stephen R. Bissette
- "In the Dust" by Tim Lebbon
- "Life Sentence" by Kelley Armstrong
- "Delice" by Holly Newstein
- "The Wind Cries Mary" by Brian Keene
- "Family Business" by Jonathan Maberry
- "The Zombie Who Fell From The Sky" by M.B. Hamler
- "My Dolly" by Derek Nikitas
- "Second Wind" by Mike Carey
- "Closure, Limited" by Max Brooks
- "Among Us" by Aimee Bender
- "Ghost Trap" by Rick Hautala
- "The Storm Door" by Tad Williams
- "Kids and Their Toys" by James A. Moore
- "Shooting Pool" by Joe R. Lansdale
- "Weaponized" by David Wellington
- "Twittering from the Circus of the Dead" by Joe Hill
