= Locke & Key (TV pilot) =

TV pilot based on the same named comic

- Logo from the Locke & Key pilot
- Genre: Horror; Thriller; Adventure; Drama
- Based on: Locke & Key by: Joe Hill; Gabriel Rodriguez
- Written by: Josh Friedman
- Directed by: Mark Romanek
- Starring: Sarah Bolger; Jesse McCartney; Miranda Otto; Mark Pellegrino
- Composers: Reinhold Heil; Johnny Klimek
- Country of origin: United States
- Original language: English
- No. of episodes: 1

Production
- Executive producers: Ted Adams; Justin Falvey; Darryl Frank; Joe Hill; Josh Friedman; Alex Kurtzman; Roberto Orci; Steven Spielberg
- Producers: Garry A. Brown; John Davis
- Production locations: Pittsburgh, Pennsylvania, USA
- Cinematography: Jeff Cutter
- Editor: Scott Gamzon
- Production companies: DreamWorks Television; Davis Entertainment; K.O. Paper Products; 20th Century Fox Television

Locke & Key is a television pilot of a TV series based on the comic book series written by Joe Hill and published by IDW Publishing. It was expected to debut in 2011, but Fox opted not to order Locke & Key to series. The plot focuses on adventure stories centered on three children who become the caretakers of a New England mansion, which is home to a bevy of secrets and magic.

== Plot summary ==
The story focuses on the Locke family as they move into Keyhouse, after the tragic murder of patriarch Rendell (Mark Pellegrino). Nina (Miranda Otto) and her three children, Tyler (Jesse McCartney), Kinsey (Sarah Bolger), and Bode (Skylar Gaertner) meet up with Rendell's brother Duncan (Nick Stahl) and look to get a fresh start. Keyhouse has been home to the Lockes for hundreds of years. Rendell and Duncan lived there growing up, but Duncan has blocked out a lot of his memories of the place. After exploring the grounds a bit, Bode finds a key with a skull on it. When he steps through the door that the key unlocks, his body drops dead but his spirit is able to fly around the house. This catches the attention of an "echo" named Dodge (Ksenia Solo), who is trapped deep within the well on the grounds. Something is clearly dark about her and we find out that she's been manipulating Rendell's killer, Sam Lesser (Harrison Thomas). The Ghost Key that Bode found is one of many scattered around the area. Each one does something special. Dodge has her eyes set on the Anywhere Key, which can transport you wherever you want to go.

== Production ==
Dimension Films acquired the film and television rights for Welcome to Lovecraft from IDW Publishing with the intent of developing the property as a feature with John Davis producing. In February 2010, it was announced that Dimension had lost the adaptation rights to DreamWorks with Alex Kurtzman and Roberto Orci signed on to develop and produce the project. In August 2010 Steven Spielberg also joined as a producer, and the production became a TV series rather than a film adaptation, with Josh Friedman writing episodes for the show and acting as showrunner.

The TV series adaptation then landed at 20th Century Fox Television. The network greenlit a pilot, produced by DreamWorks TV and K.O. Paper Products through the latter's deal with 20th Century Fox TV.

Miranda Otto played Nina Locke, Sarah Bolger was Kinsey Locke and Nick Stahl co-starred as Duncan Locke. Skylar Gaertner played 6-year old Bode, and Harrison Thomas played a teenager manipulated by an evil spirit. Actor and singer Jesse McCartney appeared as Ty Locke, the series' male lead and Ksenia Solo was cast as Dodge.

Mark Romanek directed the pilot episode, which was filmed at the mansion in Hartwood Acres and in Ellwood City, Pennsylvania in February 2011. The pilot was also shot throughout Pittsburgh that same month. In May 2011, Fox announced that the project would not be picked up to the series. The studio attempted to sell the project to other networks but eventually ceased efforts due to rising costs. However, the show has been eyed by MTV, though no official talks have been had yet. The pilot was screened at the 2011 San Diego Comic-Con, where it was well received. In January 2020, the pilot was leaked by Bloody Disgusting, who later uploaded it to Vimeo.

== Cast and characters ==
Locke & Key cast

- Miranda Otto as Nina Locke
- Jesse McCartney as Tyler Locke
- Sarah Bolger as Kinsey Locke
- Skylar Gaertner as Bode Locke
- Mark Pellegrino as Rendell Locke
- Nick Stahl as Duncan Locke
- Ksenia Solo as Dodge
- Harrison Thomas as Sam Lesser
- Kevin Jiggetts as Det. Matuku

== Critical reception ==
James Ferguson of HorrorTalk gave Locke & Key four stars (out of five) and said, "The acting throughout the episode is fantastic. You really feel for the Locke family as they attempt to recover from this horrible event in their lives. McCartney and Bolger have great chemistry as brother and sister, playing off of one another very well. Unfortunately for them, young Skylar Gertner steals every scene he's in. In many ways, he is the star of the pilot as he's the catalyst for Dodge's release from her prison as well as the search for the keys. Sometimes it takes a child's imagination to look past the restrictions most of us place on our thoughts, especially when it comes to the supernatural. The story unfolds with subtlety. We're not shown the exact events regarding Rendell's death, but we're given hints as to what happened based on the character's actions and emotions. It isn't until much later that we're given the details as well as why one of the family members feels responsible. Obviously I don't know how faithful the pilot is to the original comic, but the setup that we get from this episode would have been great for a weekly program. There's a nice reveal at the very end that would create the basis for at least a full season".
