= King Sorrow =

2025 horror novel by Joe Hill

- US hardcover
- Author: Joe Hill
- Language: English
- Genre: Horror fiction; Fantasy; Thriller; Supernatural; Occult
- Publisher: William Morrow and Company
- Publication date: October 21, 2025
- Publication place: United States
- Media type: Print (hardcover), e-book, audiobook
- Pages: 896
- ISBN: 978-0-06-220060-0

King Sorrow is a 2025 horror novel by American author Joe Hill, published by William Morrow and Company. Hill's first novel in nine years, it received positive reviews.

== Synopsis ==
Arthur Oakes, a senior at the prestigious Rackham College in Maine in the late 1980s, finds himself targeted by unscrupulous drug dealers after trying to help the gang leader's sister, proving that no good deed shall go unpunished. They extort him into stealing valuable rare books from the college library, which they sell at a fraction of their worth to pay off their higher-ups.

Arthur's friends, an eclectic group of young academics, learn of his plight and try to help him. Among the stolen books is the Crane Journal, a powerful grimoire (book of Black Magick) bound in the skin of its author. Before handing over the grimoire, they use it during a disorienting, drug-fueled ritual to summon King Sorrow, a Dragon from Long Dark beyond our reality. The King promises to eliminate their enemies on the coming Easter morning.

The group fail to realize that King Sorrow wants a victim every Easter, for the rest of their lives. Every year they do not name one, the King will claim one of them. Colin Wren, the wealthiest of the group, starts compiling lists of dangerous, murderous people for them to choose from, taking turns every year to tell King Sorrow who to attack. Though they only want one person killed every year, the Dragon finds loopholes to create increasing carnage.

When King Sorrow attacks an airliner on Easter morning, it catches the attention of world governments and private industry. The truth of the plane's forced landing is suppressed, and two members of the group, twin siblings Donna and Donavan, are kidnapped and brutally interrogated for information.

After years of study, Arthur discovers a way to defeat King Sorrow. His quest will take him on a perilous journey to meet an actual Troll. Arthur does not know that there are those among his friends that do not want to stop the Dragon, and will go to any lengths to thwart him.

== Release and reception ==
The fifth novel by Joe Hill, King Sorrow was also his first since 2016's The Fireman. Hill revealed the book's cover on social media in January 2025.

Reception to the title was positive. In their pre-release starred review, Kirkus found the novel "At turns spooky and funny, with bits of inside baseball and a swimming pool's worth of blood." Booklist called it a "remarkably well-paced, character-centered epic [that pits] the computer age against folktales", while James Gardner of Library Journal said, "Though nearly 900 pages, the book never feels long or overstuffed, since Hill deftly moves between characters' viewpoints while rendering them vividly." The staff of Publishers Weekly wrote, "Pitch-perfect characterizations and doses of black humor....[reinforce] Hill's reputation as a titan of the [horror] genre."

== Awards ==
Year	Award	Category	Result	Ref.
2025	Bram Stoker Award	Novel	Nominated	
2026	Locus Award	Horror Novel	Finalist	
2026	Dragon Awards	Horror Novel	Won	
