= Wraith: Welcome to Christmasland =

2013 comic book miniseries

- Cover of Wraith: Welcome to Christmasland 1 (November 2013), art by Gabriel Rodriguez

Publication information
- Publisher: IDW Publishing
- Schedule: Monthly
- Format: Limited series
- Genre: Horror
- Publication date: November 2013

Creative team
- Written by: Joe Hill
- Artist: C. P. Wilson III

Wraith: Welcome to Christmasland is a comic book miniseries written by Joe Hill, illustrated by C. P. Wilson III, Jay Fotos and published by IDW Publishing. It is a prequel to Hill's 2013 novel NOS4A2 and is partially derived from material cut from the novel. Hill describes it as a "sleazy '80s horror film I always wanted to do."

== Synopsis ==
The story follows a group of police officers and prisoners who find themselves in Christmasland, where they are terrorized by Charlie Manx and his abominable children.

== Story arc ==
=== "Welcome to Christmasland" ===
Issue	Release	Summary
#1	November 13, 2013	
#2	December 11, 2013	
#3	January 15, 2014	
#4	February 26, 2014	
#5	March 26, 2014	
#6	May 14, 2014	
#7	June 11, 2014	

== Reception ==
Wraith: Welcome to Christmasland was well received by critics scoring an average rating of 8.5 for the entire series based on 41 critic reviews aggregated by Comic Book Roundup.
