= In the Tall Grass =

2012 horror novella by Stephen King and Joe Hill

- An e-book cover
- Author: Stephen King, Joe Hill
- Language: English
- Genre: Horror, suspense
- Publisher: Esquire
- Publication date: June/July–August 2012
- Publication place: United States
- Media type: Magazine

In the Tall Grass is a horror novella by American writers Stephen King and his son Joe Hill. It was originally published in two parts in the June/July and August 2012 issues of Esquire magazine. This is King and Hill's second collaboration, following 2009's Throttle. On October 9, 2012, In the Tall Grass was released in e-book and audiobook formats, the latter read by Stephen Lang. It has also been published in Full Throttle, a 2019 collection of short fiction by Hill.

== Plot summary ==
Cal and Becky DeMuth are inseparable siblings (they were born 19 months apart and are called Irish twins by their parents). Becky finds out during her freshman year of college that she is pregnant, leading Cal to suggest she go live with her aunt and uncle in San Diego until the baby is born. Cal decides to take the spring semester off in order to accompany her on her cross-country trip from Durham, New Hampshire, to San Diego, California, and help her settle in. They stop at numerous tourist locations along the way.

After driving for three days, the twins are on a leg of US Route 400 in Kansas. They stop at a field of grass over six feet high after they hear a boy named Tobin calling for help. The twins also hear his mother Natalie yelling at him to stop making noise, warning "he will hear you". Cal thinks Tobin is just a few feet inside the field and walks into it to rescue the boy, Natalie's cries having mysteriously gone silent. Tobin sounds close so he dives for him, only to find no one there and realize that Tobin's voice now sounds far away.

Becky calls the authorities as she follows Cal into the field, but loses the signal just a few feet in. Cal and Becky get the idea to jump within the field to determine each other's position. The first attempt reveals they are only a yard from one another, but upon a second attempt Becky sees Cal is now a significant distance from her. Cal stumbles across a Golden Retriever's dead body, having died of dehydration. Becky and Cal become increasingly agitated when they realize the field is somehow shifting their location from one another, one minute sounding close and the next leagues away.

Becky recites limericks to comfort herself as well as give Cal and Tobin an anchor point to her location. She spies someone ahead, and a man steps out of the grass. He introduces himself as Ross, saying that he is the father of Tobin and the husband of Natalie. He begs Becky to follow him, saying that she will be safe with him. Despite her reservations, Ross convinces her to follow him anyway. He lures her to a stamped-down circle of grass, where Becky finds Natalie's bloody, dismembered body. Ross explains that he found "the rock" and that "the dancing men have shown [him] the secrets of the tall grass". He attacks, but Becky stabs him to death with nail scissors.

Cal, now severely dehydrated and exhausted in his attempt to look for Becky, feverishly drinks the gritty water that the grass grows in. Now crazed, he attempts to burn down the field with matches, but the grass is too wet to set alight. He finally runs into Tobin, who is eating a dead, rotting crow. Tobin explains that the rotting dog was his, and that "the tall grass doesn't move dead things." Tobin leads Cal to a clearing in the middle of the field, where a large rock covered with carvings of dancing men stands. Tobin says that the rock will help Cal find Becky like it helped Tobin find him. Cal, despite his fear of the rock and the strange carvings that seem to move on their own, gives in and touches it.

Meanwhile, Becky gives birth prematurely and the baby is stillborn. Cal and Tobin appear and wrap the baby in a shirt. She passes out to "slurping sounds" and Cal feeds her the baby. Cal and Tobin drag Becky to the rock and throw her on it.

An unspecified amount of time later, an RV full of hippies pulls into the parking lot of an abandoned church across the road from the field to have a barbecue. They hear Tobin's calls for rescue, and the whole group walks into the tall grass to help.

== Adaptations ==
Director Vincenzo Natali had wanted to make a film adaptation of In the Tall Grass as early as 2015, when he stated:

Who would think that grass could be frightening? Trust Stephen King and Joe Hill to find a way. They have transformed an otherwise innocuous Kansas field into a stage for some of the most disturbing horror fiction I have ever read."

In May 2018, Netflix announced that it had purchased the film rights, setting Natali to direct and adapt the screenplay. In the Tall Grass began streaming on Netflix on October 4, 2019.

== See also ==
- Stephen King short fiction bibliography
