= Strange Weather =

Strange Weather may refer to:

- Strange Weather (EP), a 2014 EP by Anna Calvi
- Strange Weather (Glenn Frey album), 1992
- Strange Weather (Marianne Faithfull album), 1987
- Strange Weather (film), a 2016 American film
- Strange Weather (Joe Hill book), 2017
