= Throttle (disambiguation) =

A throttle is any mechanism by which the power or speed of an engine is controlled.

Throttle or throttling may also refer to:

== Fiction ==
- Throttle (film), a 2005 thriller
- Throttle (novella), a 2009 novella by Stephen King and his son Joe Hill
- Throttle, one of the three main characters of Biker Mice from Mars

== Science and technology ==
- Rocket engine throttling
- Thrust lever or throttle lever, a device for controlling aircraft engines
- Throttling process (thermodynamics), an isenthalpic process in thermodynamics

=== Computing ===
- CPU throttling, computer hardware speed control, also known as dynamic frequency scaling
- Bandwidth throttling, used to control the bandwidth that a network application can use
- Throttling process (computing), software speed control

== Other uses ==
- Strangling, compression of the neck
- DVD-by-mail throttling, the process of penalizing the most active users in subscription-based DVD-by-mail businesses, by slowing shipments or sending less desirable movies
- Dave Wottle (born 1950), American athlete nicknamed "The Throttle"

== See also ==
- Teddy at the Throttle, a 1917 American comedy short film
