= Gabriel Rodriguez (artist) =

Chilean comic book artist

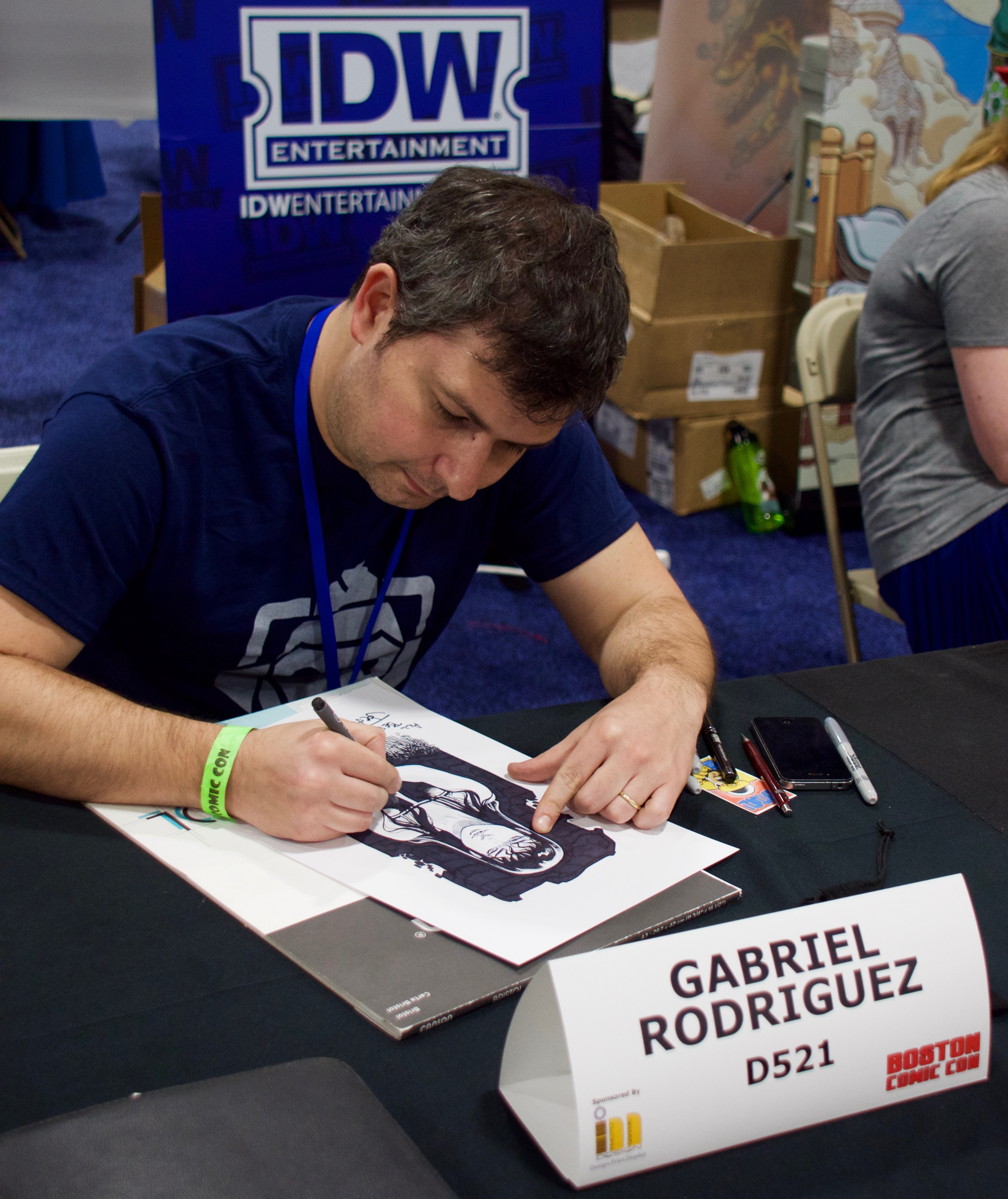
- Rodriguez at the Boston Comic Con in 2015
- Born: Gabriel Rodríguez Pérez; 1974 (age 51–52) Santiago
- Areas: Penciller, Inker
- Notable works: Locke & Key

Gabriel Rodríguez Peréz (born May 26, 1974) is a Chilean comic book artist and architect, known for his work on the horror series Locke & Key. He also did the artwork for Subterranean Press's edition of Joe Hill's novel NOS4A2 and Scribner's edition of Stephen King and Peter Straub's novel Other Worlds Than These.

== Early life ==
Rodríguez Pérez was born in Santiago de Chile, son of Gabriel Rodríguez Lazcano and journalist María Eugenia Pérez.

== Career ==
Before starting a career as comic artist, he studied Architecture at the Pontifical Catholic University of Chile where he got his degree and also a M.Arch. Due to the small scale of the comics market in Chile, Rodríguez had to work part-time as architect while drawing comics for art's sake or some extra income. His first commission was a set of illustrations for Mitos y Leyendas (Myths and Legends), a collectible cards game by SALO Publishing. Rodríguez spent 4 years working for them until he got a call from the US producers of the CSI TV series and IDW Publishing crew, to make a comic version of the series. From then on he was able to work full-time as a comic artist.

Rodriguez was subsequently introduced to writer Joe Hill, author and son of Stephen King. Together they spawned the Locke & Key series, which earned Rodríguez his first Eisner Award nomination. After that, Rodríguez was commissioned by DC Comics to draw Adventures of Superman (2013) and IDW's Little Nemo, Return to Slumberland, which earned him another Eisner Award nomination.

In April 2022, Rodriguez was reported among the more than three dozen comics creators who contributed to Operation USA's benefit anthology book, Comics for Ukraine: Sunflower Seeds, a project spearheaded by IDW Publishing Special Projects Editor Scott Dunbier, whose profits would be donated to relief efforts for Ukrainian refugees resulting from the February 2022 Russian invasion of Ukraine. Rodriguez teamed up with writer Mark Waid to produce an original story with new characters created specifically for the anthology.

== Awards ==
Rodríguez was nominated for Best Penciller/Inker for the 2011 Eisner Awards for his work on Locke & Key. In addition, Locke & Key was nominated for "Best Continuing Series" and "Best Single Issue (or One-Shot)" for Locke & Key: Keys to the Kingdom #1.

In April 2015, his and fellow Chilean artist Nelson Daniel's work, Little Nemo: Return to Slumberland (IDW) was nominated for the Eisner Awards, winning Best Limited Series in July 2015.

He and Nelson Daniel were awarded the Grand Prize at the FIC Santiago 2016 for “Little Nemo: Return to Slumberland”. He also won the "Best Chilean Comic Artist" Award at the FIC Santiago 2013.
