= NOS4A2 =

2013 novel by Joe Hill

- Author: Joe Hill
- Language: English
- Genre: Horror; Dark Fantasy
- Publisher: William Morrow and Company
- Publication place: United States
- English publication date: April 30, 2013
- Pages: 692 pages
- ISBN: 978-0-06-220057-0
- Dewey Decimal: 813/.6
- LC Class: PS3608.I4342 N67 2013

NOS4A2 (pronounced Nosferatu) is the third novel by American author Joe Hill. The book was published on April 30, 2013, through William Morrow and Company, and has since been adapted to a television series. NOS4A2 is a horror novel about a woman trying to save her son from a vicious, supernatural killer.

A limited-edition version of the book was released through Subterranean Press, featuring the novella Wraith that was cut from the manuscript as well as an alternate ending. The novel is called NOS4R2 in the United Kingdom.

== Plot ==
In 1986, eight-year-old Victoria "Vic" McQueen discovers that she can find lost items by riding her Raleigh Bike through a particular covered bridge near her home in Massachusetts, which will transport her to the location of whatever she is seeking. For instance, when her mom, Linda, loses a butterfly bracelet, Vic goes back to a diner in New Hampshire to get it back.

Vic soon discovers that each trip through this "Shorter Way" Bridge exacts an increasing mental and physical toll on her. In order to prevent people from thinking her crazy or a liar, Vic must come up with excuses to explain how she is able to find items. On one such trip, Vic travels to an Iowa library where she meets Maggie Leigh, a librarian with a stutter who can use Scrabble tiles to gain information about future events. Maggie explains that they are both "creatives" who have the special ability to access "inscapes" outside of the normal world. Doing so takes a toll on the user, however, in the form of Vic's fevers and Maggie's gradually worsening stutter. Maggie warns Vic about a man she refers to as "the Wraith", a dangerous man with powers similar to theirs who drives a 1938 Rolls-Royce. Vic travels home but loses her bike and, as a result of using the Shorter Way, develops a terrible fever.

Meanwhile, the man Maggie warned about, Charles Talent Manx III, kidnaps children across the country in the Rolls-Royce. Manx enlists chemical plant worker Bing Partridge to steal a supply of gingerbread-scented sevoflurane from his workplace, which Manx uses to incapacitate his victims. Manx takes the children he abducts to a mysterious amusement park called "Christmasland" where they can purportedly be happy forever. Bing uses the sevoflurane to incapacitate the children's parents before raping and killing them.

In 1996, after separate arguments with her separated parents, 17-year-old Vic follows the Shorter Way to Sleigh House, Manx's residence in Colorado, so that she can be abducted to spite her mother. Upon arrival, she finds a child locked in the back of Manx's car and attempts to rescue him. Vic soon finds out, however, that the child has apparently become a monster in league with Manx. Vic takes refuge in Manx's house but is soon forced to flee when he arrives. She manages to escape Sleigh House at the last moment through a laundry chute after setting it on fire. She runs into overweight motorcyclist Lou Carmody, who takes her to a gas station to call the police. Manx arrives at the same station to purchase gas and is captured by the police after he attacks Vic and kills a soldier coming to her aid. Vic does not tell the police about how she arrived at Sleigh House, and they assume that Manx had kidnapped her and brought her to Colorado.

By 2008, Vic has entered into a relationship with Lou and has given birth to a son, Bruce Wayne Carmody, and develops a successful series of children's books. However, she remains unhappy and scarred by her past. Vic begins to be harassed by phone calls from Christmasland's vampire children, who chastise her for Manx's arrest and threaten to target Wayne. Vic's torment drives her to accidentally burn down the family's house, destroying her relationship with Lou and Wayne. Eventually, they part ways and Vic recovers after a stay in a psychiatric hospital. Meanwhile, in a prison infirmary, Manx briefly wakes from a coma to threaten a nurse.

In 2012, Maggie visits Vic with the news that Manx died in prison, resurrected himself, and then escaped. Vic refuses to believe Maggie and sends her away. Manx reunites and resumes abducting children with Bing. They kill Vic's neighbors and move into their house, watching Vic and her son from a distance. As Vic takes an old Triumph motorcycle for a test drive and discovers that it can enter the Shorter Way, Manx and Bing kidnap Wayne, who manages to contact Lou. Vic calls the police to report that Manx has abducted her child, but they refuse to believe her since Manx is officially dead. Instead, the police suspect Vic in the disappearance of her son, and FBI psychologist Tabitha Hutter is assigned to psychoanalyze her. Despite a cell phone trace that shows Wayne traveling toward Christmasland, on a severely distorted map of the United States, Hutter does not believe Vic's story.

Vic decides to find Wayne using the Shorter Way and runs from the police. She arrives at Bing's house and he attacks her, but she kills him in self-defense by lighting his sevoflurane on fire. Vic calls Lou and tells him what happened, giving Lou a subtle hint to meet her at her estranged father's house. Vic takes the Shorter Way to visit Maggie, who explains that Manx depends on the Rolls-Royce to reach Christmasland and steal his victims' souls so that he can retain his youth; the only way to stop him is to destroy the car. While Vic sleeps, Maggie finds a message in the tiles - "When the angels fall, the children go home" - and leaves a copy for her. Maggie spots Wayne outside the library and runs to get him, but is killed by Manx. Narrowly avoiding capture by local police, Vic takes the Shorter Way to reach her father's house, where Lou has already arrived. Vic's father supplies them with a load of explosives that he uses for his demolition work.

Hutter and the police arrive at the house to detain Vic. She explains details of Maggie's death that had happened far away only a short time earlier, making Hutter more willing to listen to her. However, the police kill Vic's father when he tries to protect her. Using the Shorter Way, Vic escapes and takes Lou to Christmasland. When she arrives, she pursues Manx through the park. Manx refuses to return Wayne and orders the children he has kidnapped to attack Vic. She is wounded in the fight but succeeds in destroying Christmasland with the explosives and escapes with Wayne via the Shorter Way to reach Lou. When Manx gives chase, the bridge collapses under the weight of his car and he is transported to 1986. The car falls into the river where Vic initially used the Shorter Way and is destroyed, killing Manx. After they return, Vic dies from her injuries.

By the following October, Lou has lost weight and has begun a relationship with Hutter. Wayne begins to receive telephone calls from the children Manx kidnapped and finds himself taking pleasure in the tragedy, making him fear that he might be able to rebuild Christmasland and continue Manx's work on his own. Lou and Hutter take him to the burned-out ruin of the Sleigh House and begin smashing the Christmas ornaments hung in the trees there. As they do so, many of Manx's victims emerge into the real world, still of childhood age and with their humanity fully restored as predicted by Maggie's message in the library. Wayne feels himself heal after the moon ornament he had chosen for himself is broken.

== Reception ==
Critical reception of NOS4A2 was mostly positive, with the Library Journal praising NOS4A2 as "fascinating and utterly engaging," while USA Today gave a positive review and commented that the book "[reimagined] the vampire epic."

=== Awards and honors ===
The A.V. Club, Library Journal, and Time magazine named NOS4A2 as one of the ten best books of 2013.

NOS4A2 was nominated for the 2013 Bram Stoker Award for Best Novel.

== Connections ==
The novel includes several references to Joe Hill's other works. Charles Manx, discussing the concept of "inscapes" and secret places, refers to the Treehouse of the Mind (from Horns) and Craddock McDermott (from Heart-Shaped Box). Later in the novel, the FBI tries to use a cell phone map to track Wayne's cell phone; the map includes the town of Lovecraft, Massachusetts, from Locke & Key. According to Hill, the novel also includes references to two novels, Orphanhenge and The Crooked Alley, that he may publish in the future.

Hill also included several references to the works of his father, Stephen King. Manx refers to the gates to Mid-World and Shawshank Prison, and says that the True Knot follow nearly the same profession as he does. The phone map also shows Derry, Maine, and a place called "Pennywise's Circus". Hill describes Vic's return from Christmasland as returning "to the clearing at the end of the path", an expression used in The Dark Tower books to refer to an individual's death. In a 2013 interview, Hill says that these references were not meant to tie his works to King's shared world. He claims he was "just fooling around".

In King's novel Doctor Sleep, published later in 2013, Dick Hallorann reveals that during his childhood, an abusive paternal grandfather threatened that Charlie Manx could be called to take children away, although Hallorann states in his recounting that he believes that Manx was a fiction constructed by his grandfather. Doctor Sleep also makes a brief reference to Christmasland, implying that the True Knot have visited.

Bing Partridge (also known as the Gasmask Man) says, "My life for you," in a desperate show of devotion to Manx, a clear reference to the same line spoken by the Trashcan Man to Randall Flagg of King's The Stand. It is also the same phrase that Andrew Quick, the Tick Tock Man, says to Flagg in book 3 of The Dark Tower series.

Hill's story "Dark Carousel," included in his 2019 anthology Full Throttle, includes a reference to NOS4A2. At a boardwalk amusement park, the operator of a strange carousel ride explains to a group of visitors that he acquired its animal mounts from various amusement parks throughout the world, including a cat from Christmasland.

A character listens to Frobisher’s Sextet named "Cloud Atlas", which is referring to the book of the same name by David Mitchell.

== Adaptation and continuation ==
On December 8, 2015, it was announced that the novel was in development to become a TV series on AMC. On April 10, 2018, AMC officially ordered a 10-episode television series. Jami O'Brien was set to be showrunner and executive producer. All ten episodes for the series were made available on June 2, 2019, released for AMC Premiere, AMC's on-demand service. A second season aired from June 21 to August 23, 2020.
