= The Fireman (novel) =

Novel by Joe Hill

- US cover
- Author: Joe Hill
- Language: English
- Genre: Post-apocalyptic; dark fantasy; science fiction
- Publisher: William Morrow and Company
- Publication place: United States
- English publication date: May 17, 2016
- Pages: 768

The Fireman is a novel set in a post-apocalyptic time by American author Joe Hill. The novel, Hill's fourth, tells the tale of a deadly spore that has infected most of the world's population. Hill first spoke of the novel in 2013 in promotional interviews for his then-new novel NOS4A2. The novel was released on May 17, 2016.

== Background ==
Hill first spoke of the novel during his book tour for his previous book, NOS4A2. He described it early on as a "science fiction novel about being happy in the face of darkness". He went on to say that the book is "less like Matheson, more like Crichton. Less like Hell House, more like The Andromeda Strain". On September 5, 2014, Hill did an early reading of the novel as a part of the Pixels Project on YouTube. During the middle of 2015, he spoke of the novel quite often on his Twitter account saying that it is a "big book" that is "about A Game of Thrones size."

== Plot ==
A mysterious fungus has begun to infect the world's population, causing a condition popularly known as "Dragonscale." The illness manifests as a pattern of black and gold markings on an afflicted person's skin, eventually causing them to burst into flame and die. There is no known cure, and the fungal spores easily become airborne from the victims' ashes.

When New Hampshire school nurse Harper Grayson becomes infected, her relationship with her husband Jakob quickly sours and he leaves her. She later discovers that he has had affairs with multiple women and begun to write a book in which he denigrates her and brags about his infidelity. Learning that she is now pregnant, Harper seeks shelter with her brother but is turned away. With the help of "The Fireman," a strange man dressed in firefighting gear, and two children named Allie and Nick, Harper escapes Jakob's attempt to kill her and flees their home. The Fireman has contracted Dragonscale, but is able to ignite and extinguish parts of his body at will without danger to his life.

The Fireman brings Harper to an abandoned summer camp that now serves as a secret refuge for infected people. To Harper's surprise, they have found a way to live without fear of death from Dragonscale, reinforcing their positive emotions through group singing. Retaking her maiden name of Willowes, Harper is quickly enlisted as a camp nurse and meets Father Tom Storey, its leader and the grandfather of Allie and Nick. The Fireman (real name John Rookwood) had had a relationship with Tom's daughter Sarah, the children's mother, who has since died. Tensions begin to grow among the residents, fueled by dwindling food supplies and a rash of thefts.

Harper finds a journal kept by Harold Cross, a former resident who had been shot and killed for communicating with the outside world. Harold had shared information with medical communities in the hope of learning more about Dragonscale, and had discovered that the spores became dormant upon exposure to high levels of the hormone oxytocin, released during activities that foster a strong sense of social bonding.

While visiting John on a small island nearby, Harper sees a woman's face in the flames of a furnace he uses for heat. Upon her return to the camp, she finds that Tom has suffered a severe head injury and must perform an impromptu trepanning operation to relieve pressure on his brain. Tom survives but falls into a coma, and suspicions about who attacked him begin to spread. Harper sneaks away from the camp to collect medical supplies from her home, but is forced to hide for several hours when Jakob arrives with a gang of men who have been killing and incinerating the infected. She visits John and persuades him to assist in the hijacking of an ambulance for medical supplies by sending a fiery phoenix to ward off any defenders.

By this point, Tom's other daughter Carol has assumed dictatorial control of the camp and begun to punish rulebreakers by making them hold stones in their mouths for set lengths of time. When Harper refuses to submit to such treatment for leaving the area, a group of girls force a stone into her mouth and cut her hair off. The hijacking results in several deaths, including two police officers, and Tom suffers a near-fatal seizure before the raiding party returns. Carol decides to expel Harper from the camp if he dies, keeping her baby in order to compel her silence about the location.

A group of dissenters begin making plans to leave the camp for good and elect Harper as their leader. She begins to fall in love with John and learns that Nick taught him how to control his fire by tricking the spores into not seeing him as a host organism. When she tries to manifest the effect herself, John angrily tells her to stop and explains that Nick had tried to teach Sarah after she deliberately infected herself, only for her to lose control and burn to death. The face in his furnace is her spirit, preserved by the spores' interaction with her brain; he keeps it lit as a final link to her. Tom awakens from his coma and tells Harper that Carol set Harold up to be killed.

Harper and the dissenters retrieve John from his island, but are captured upon their return by Michael Lindqvist, Carol's secret lover, who had assisted in the betrayal of Harold. Michael admits to assaulting Tom and has now killed him to prevent him from revealing the truth, and Carol uses fabricated evidence to falsely accuse Harper of his murder and of plotting to take over the camp. Her followers begin to attack the dissenters, but Nick launches a fiery counterstrike to rescue them and Harper uses her newfound powers for support. Led by a captured survivor of the hijacking, Jakob's gang invades the camp and kills many residents with gunfire; the rest take shelter in an onsite church, but most of them ignite and die when the spores in their bodies react to the overwhelming stress of the situation.

Harper, John, Allie, and Nick escape the church as Jakob destroys it with a snowplow, and they and fellow resident Renee Gilmonton take shelter in a maintenance garage at a nearby cemetery. Nick confesses to the camp thefts as part of a plan to catch a stray cat with Michael's help. Learning from a radio broadcast that a detachment of firefighters is scheduled to enter neighboring Maine, the five make plans to sneak across the state line with them and then travel to an island near the town of Machias allegedly offering safety to Dragonscale sufferers.

Using an antique firetruck, they slip through a government checkpoint but find the road filled with obstacles that greatly slow their progress. Jakob catches up to them in his snowplow and tries to kill Harper, but Sarah's spirit emerges from a bucket of smoldering coals that John has brought from his furnace; she kills Jakob and says goodbye to Allie and Nick before dissipating. The firetruck falls off a collapsed bridge, severely injuring John, and the others build a travois to carry him as they continue on foot.

They reach Machias and board a ferry to the island, but a crewman tells Harper during the trip that the refuge no longer exists. Those who come looking for it are given sedative-laced food, then pushed overboard to drown once they fall unconscious. John fights back but is wounded by gunfire; as the others jump overboard to safety, he becomes a phoenix and destroys the boat. He flies away, but another camp escapee later arrives in a boat of his own to pick up the group, having followed their progress via radio. Harper gives birth to her baby, a daughter she names Ashley, and the group set sail across the Atlantic Ocean to seek out a rumored refuge on an island off the coast of Ireland.

A short epilogue hidden in the book's credits section reveals that the boat arrives at an unspecified safe haven, with a phoenix propelling it by generating wind for its sails.

== Adaptations ==
On January 8, 2016, 20th Century Fox and Temple Hill Entertainment were set to produce the film adaptation with Louis Leterrier attached to direct. On February 10, 2022, Walden Media was set to produce the television adaptation with Hill attached as an executive producer.
