= Horns (film) =

2013 film by Alexandre Aja

- Teaser poster
- Directed by: Alexandre Aja
- Screenplay by: Keith Bunin
- Based on: Horns by Joe Hill
- Produced by: Alexandre Aja; Riza Aziz; Joey McFarland; Cathy Schulman; Joe Hill
- Starring: Daniel Radcliffe; Max Minghella; Joe Anderson; Juno Temple; Kelli Garner; James Remar; Kathleen Quinlan; Heather Graham; David Morse
- Cinematography: Frederick Elmes
- Edited by: Baxter
- Music by: Robin Coudert
- Production companies: Red Granite Pictures; Mandalay Pictures
- Distributed by: Dimension Films; RADiUS-TWC (United States); VVS Films (Canada)
- Release dates: September 6, 2013 (TIFF); October 6, 2014
- Running time: 120 minutes
- Countries: United States; Canada
- Language: English
- Box office: $3.9 million

Horns is a 2013 comedy horror film directed by Alexandre Aja from a screenplay written by Keith Bunin, based on the 2010 novel by Joe Hill. It stars Daniel Radcliffe as a young man wrongly accused of murdering his girlfriend, who uses his newly discovered paranormal abilities to uncover the real killer.

Horns premiered at the 2013 Toronto International Film Festival and was theatrically released in the United States on October 31, 2014, to mixed reviews.

== Plot ==
Ignatius "Ig" Perrish is the prime suspect when his girlfriend, Merrin Williams, is raped and murdered. Despite his declarations of innocence, he is shunned by the community. He visits his parents and brother, Terry, to hide from the press. After a vigil led by Merrin's father, who believes Ig to be guilty, Ig gets drunk, urinates on Merrin's memorial, and has a one-night stand with his friend from the childhood, Glenna. The next morning, he wakes up with a pair of horns protruding from his head. The horns have special powers that force people to tell Ig their darkest secrets and desires; at Ig's bidding, they act upon them.

While seeing his doctor about having the horns removed, Ig, under anesthesia, dreams of his childhood, when he first met Merrin. After noticing Merrin drop and break her necklace in church, a young Ig and his friends play with cherry bombs. Ig risks a dangerous dare to win a cherry bomb and nearly drowns, but is saved by Lee Tourneau, his childhood best friend, who is now a lawyer. After Lee has fixed Merrin's broken necklace, Ig gives the cherry bomb that he won to him in exchange for the necklace so that he can be the one to return it to Merrin. Lee loses two fingers when the cherry bomb goes off accidentally in his hand. Ig and Merrin bond over the fixed necklace and fall in love, frequenting a treehouse in the woods together.

Ig visits his parents and, under the horns' power, his mother reveals that she does not want him as her son and asks him to leave. His father tells him he is worthless without Merrin and his friend helped him burn down the lab where DNA tests were being conducted. As Ig heads to a bar, in the parking lot he goads the reporters into a brawl by promising that he would give the exclusive to whoever wins. He tries to find evidence proving that he did not kill Merrin from people in the bar. Several people confess their deepest and darkest secrets, then the owner-bartender fulfills his dark desire to burn down the building to collect the insurance.

From one confession from one of the bar customers, Ig learns a new witness in the case is a waitress at the diner where Merrin broke up with him the night she died. Ig finds her and discovers she has been fabricating her stories to become famous. When Ig talks to Terry, he learns that Terry drove Merrin from the diner the night she died. When he touches Terry, Ig sees what happened that night: Merrin left the car en route to her home and ran into the woods. Terry passed out in the car and woke up the next morning with a bloody rock in his hand, finding Merrin dead under the treehouse. Afraid that he would be implicated, he fled. Infuriated, Ig assaults Terry until he is arrested by Officer Eric Hannity, who is another childhood friend. The next morning, Ig is released from jail with Lee's help. Ig notices Lee wearing Merrin's cross necklace and questions him about it. Lee insists there are things about him and Merrin that Ig never knew.

Later that night, Ig realizes snakes are following him wherever he goes and he uses them to exact vengeance against the waitress. Additionally, he gets Eric to act on his feelings for his police partner (who reciprocates his feelings) and forces Terry to overdose on drugs, causing Terry to be tormented by memories of Merrin's death. Ig meets Lee by the docks and pulls off Merrin's necklace. He realizes Lee was unable to see the horns because he was wearing the necklace. Exposed to the horns, Lee falls under their influence and admits to killing Merrin. In flashbacks, Lee was also in love with Merrin and was deeply jealous of Ig throughout their childhood. Lee followed Merrin into the woods, thinking that Merrin had been sending him signals for a long time and that she had broken up with Ig to be with him. When Merrin insisted that she loved Ig more than anyone in the world, Lee raped her in a jealous rage and killed her with a rock, stole her necklace, and planted the bloody rock on Terry. In the ensuing confrontation, Lee overpowers Ig and lights him on fire in his car, causing Ig to drive into the bay. Lee claims that Ig confessed to the crime and committed suicide. The horns allow Ig to survive, though horrifically burned and disfigured.

Merrin's father, who now believes that Ig is innocent, gives him the key to Merrin's lockbox. When Ig puts on Merrin's cross, his body is restored and the horns disappear. In the lockbox, he finds a note from Merrin explaining that she knew Ig was going to propose, but she was dying of cancer and did not want him to suffer, so she pushed him away under the pretense of loving someone else.

Ig confronts Lee and leads him into the woods where Merrin was killed. Eric and Terry arrive to arrest Lee. Lee confesses to the murder, but then gleefully kills Eric and injures Terry. Ig tears off the necklace, sprouting a pair of wings and bursting into flame, transforming into a demonic monster. Despite Lee fatally wounding him, Ig impales Lee on one of his horns and telepathically forces a snake down Lee's throat, killing him. Saying that his vengeance was all-consuming, Ig dies from his injuries and his smoldering corpse turns to hardened ash, and he appears to be reunited with Merrin in the afterlife.

== Cast ==
- Daniel Radcliffe as Ignatius "Ig" Perrish, a 26-year-old man who wakes up after a drunken night to find two protrusions growing from his forehead, which give him the power to compel people to unravel their deepest secrets. Radcliffe stated, "It's a very, very different type of part than anything I've done before", adding that the role was "deeply emotional and also incredibly outrageous in some ways".
  - Mitchell Kummen as young Ig
- Max Minghella as Lee Tourneau, Ig's childhood best friend and now lawyer.
  - Dylan Schmid as young Lee
- Joe Anderson as Terry Perrish, Ig's alcoholic, drug-addicted older brother, who is also a talented musician.
  - Jared Ager-Foster as young Terry
- Juno Temple as Merrin Williams, Ig's deceased girlfriend, who was raped and murdered.
  - Sabrina Carpenter as young Merrin Williams
- Kelli Garner as Glenna
  - Laine MacNeil as young Glenna
- James Remar as Derrick Perrish
- Kathleen Quinlan as Lydia Perrish
- Heather Graham as Veronica, The Waitress
- David Morse as Dale Williams
- Alex Zahara as Dr. Renald
- Kendra Anderson as Delilah
- Michael Adamthwaite as Eric Hannity, Ig's gay friend, who is now a cop.
  - Erik McNamee as young Eric
- Desiree Zurowski as Radio reporter

Shia LaBeouf was originally set to play Ig but was later replaced with Radcliffe.

The band seen backing up Joe Anderson's character on lead trumpet is The Brass Action from Vancouver, British Columbia. The scene features the band's song, "The Devil Down Below".

== Production ==
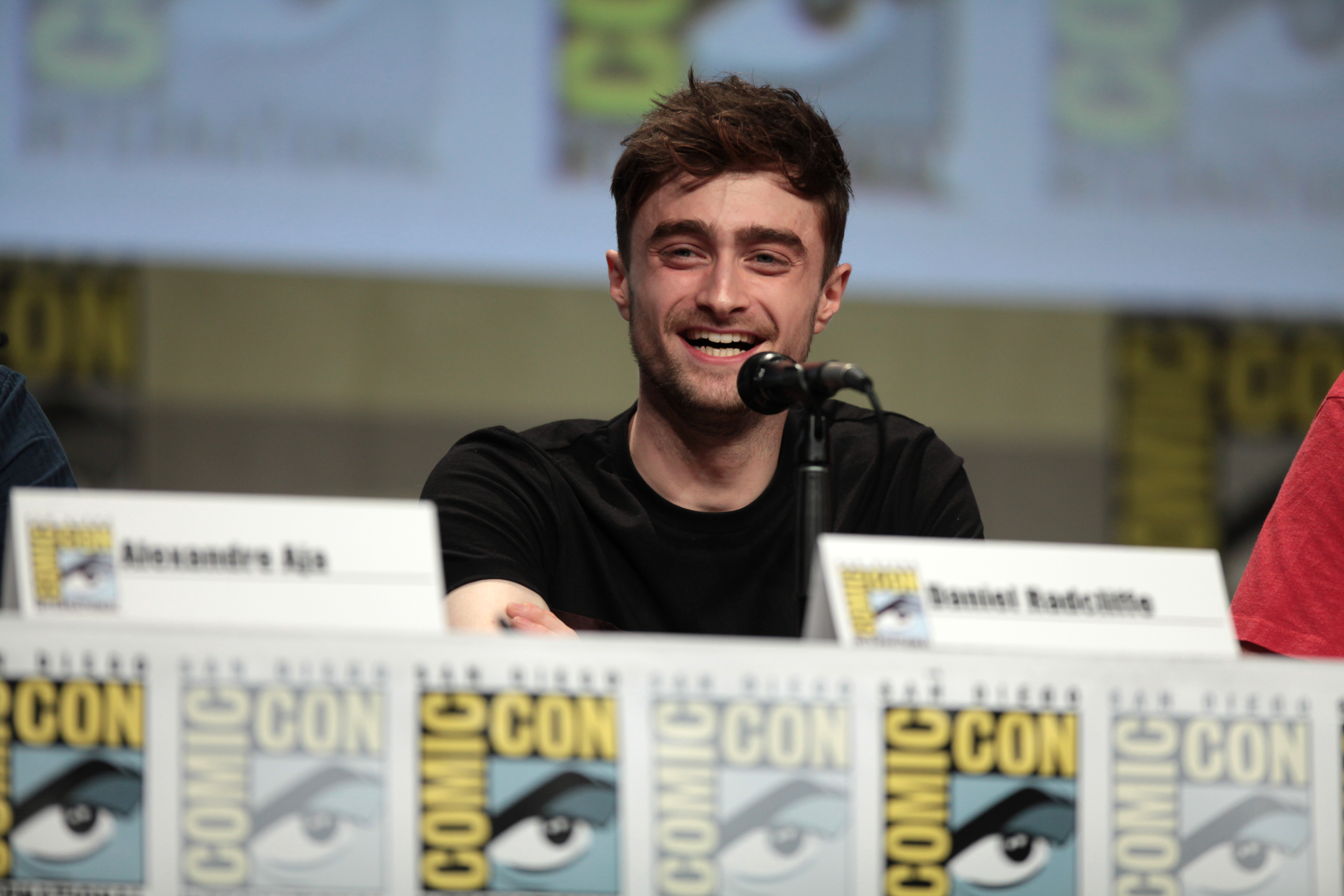
Radcliffe at a panel for the film at San Diego Comic-Con in July 2014

Explaining his initial interest in the project, Alexandre Aja said "After reading Joe Hill's cult book, I couldn't resist temptation to dive into the devilish underworld and reinvent a universal myth."

Principal photography started late September 2012, in British Columbia. The filming took place in Vancouver, Mission, Surrey and Squamish, completing shooting in December 2012.

During production, Daniel Radcliffe accidentally ingested antifreeze while drinking tap water from one of the trailers. Radcliffe explained in an interview that the water contained antifreeze to prevent freezing, but there were no signs indicating it was non-potable. As a result, he became violently ill for three days, though he did not require hospitalization.

== Release ==
The world premiere was held at the 2013 Toronto International Film Festival. The film was released in North America and the United Kingdom on October 31, 2014; however, the movie was also made available via digital download on iTunes as of October 6, 2014.

The film's North American distribution rights were acquired by Dimension Films and RADiUS-TWC. Anchor Bay Entertainment released the film on January 13, 2015, on DVD and Blu-ray.

== Reception ==
=== Box office ===
Horns grossed a total of $3,875,442 worldwide in 31 days of release.

=== Critical response ===
On Rotten Tomatoes, 41% of 123 critics' reviews have given Horns a positive review, with an average rating of 5.4/10. The site's critical consensus says "Horns is a bit of a tonal jumble, but it offers enough thoughtful horror-comedy—and strong work from Daniel Radcliffe—to hook genre enthusiasts." On Metacritic, the film has a weighted average score of 46 out of 100 based on 35 critics, indicating "mixed or average" reviews.

Joe Hill, who wrote the novel the film is based on, praised Radcliffe's performance, calling it a "wrenching, vulnerable, emotionally naked performance that isn't like anything he's ever done on screen before. He is such a wonderful Ig Perrish". John DeFore of The Hollywood Reporter gave a positive review of the film, remarking, "While this all begins as a kind of supernatural black comedy ... the tone grows darker with each revelation".

The Guardian scored the film two out of five stars, calling it "a Dogma-style mash-up of grim comedy and religious satire". Eric Kohn of IndieWire wrote, "Predominantly a failure of tone, "Horns" has plenty of admirable traits and yet dooms itself from the outset. It's an admirable conceit stuffed into far less subtle material." Peter Debruge of Variety sensed that the film "benefits from the helmer's twisted sensibility, but suffers from a case of overall silliness." Jonathan Weichsel of MoreHorror.com stated that "The cast is all around terrific, especially Daniel Radcliffe who is nothing short of phenomenal, and the set pieces are entertaining in that wild, over the top way that only horror can pull off effectively."
