= Strange Weather (book) =

2017 collection of novellas by Joe Hill

- Author: Joe Hill
- Language: English
- Genre: Post-apocalyptic; Horror; Dark Fantasy
- Publisher: William Morrow and Company
- Publication place: United States
- English publication date: October 24, 2017
- Pages: 448
- ISBN: 978-0-06-266311-5 (Hardcover)

Strange Weather is a collection of novellas written by American author Joe Hill. It was released in the US on October 24, 2017.

== Synopsis ==
=== Snapshot ===
In Silicon Valley in 1988, 13-year-old Michael Figlione finds his elderly next-door-neighbor, Shelly Beukes, disoriented and wandering the street. She tells him about a strange man carrying an instant camera and warns him not to let the man take his picture. Michael later encounters the man, whom he dubs "The Phoenician" for his multiple tattoos in that language, and discovers that he can erase people's memories by taking their picture. During a thunderstorm, Michael checks on Shelly and finds the Phoenician taking pictures of her. He seizes the camera and uses it to erase so much of the Phoenician's memory that he can barely move or function, then orders him to leave the neighborhood forever. Shelly's husband moves her into a retirement home, where she lives in squalor until Michael takes enough pictures of her to make her forget how to breathe, allowing her to die. He runs over the camera with his car, finding it to contain a strange tarry liquid with a large yellow eye at its center. The material quickly hardens to a metallic solid, which he ultimately uses in his graduate research to develop a revolutionary memory storage system for electronic devices.

=== Loaded ===
Mall security guard Randall Kellaway is served with a restraining order barring him from contact with his wife and young son, and he is further ordered to surrender all the firearms he owns. Buying a pistol from a friend, he responds to a jilted mistress killing her partner and boss by shooting her, as well as a Muslim woman and her infant son, thinking both women were in league as part of a terrorist attack. He then kills a teenager who witnessed the incident and removes evidence from the scene, intending to frame the mistress as being responsible for all the other deaths. The police and the modern gun rights movement hold Kellaway up as a hero for preventing a potential mass shooting by killing the mistress. However, reporter Aisha Lanternglass researches the story and starts publishing the truth, leading Kellaway to crack under media pressure. After his friend commits suicide, he takes the latter's guns and kills his family and friends before storming Lanternglass's newsroom and massacring everyone inside. The story ends with a terrified Lanternglass and her daughter facing an armed Kellaway, who tells Lanternglass that her story might have a different ending had she had a gun.

=== Aloft ===
Aubrey Griffin is about to go skydiving for the first time to fulfill a promise he made to a friend who has recently died of cancer. As the plane is ascending to jump altitude over Ohio, he notices a large cloud shaped like a flying saucer that is moving in the opposite direction of all the others in the sky. The plane's electrical system suddenly fails, and Aubrey and the jumpmaster harnessed to him are forced to dive out for safety. They land on the cloud after falling less than forty feet; Aubrey is unhurt, but the jumpmaster breaks several bones on impact and is dragged off the edge by his parachute once Aubrey unhooks the harness.

The cloud is solid enough to walk on and produces items for Aubrey's comfort, such as a bed and sexual companionship, but he finds that it was the cause of the plane's electrical failure. The "food" it produces causes severe internal bleeding, and any attempt to reach the center of the cloud or even think about reversing its course triggers a powerful psychic attack that leaves him nearly unable to function. Aubrey discovers the remains of a hot air balloon and its three occupants, one of whom killed the others and then committed suicide after they crashed on the cloud in 1859.

Arming himself with the killer's pistol, he forces himself to reach the center and finds a giant alien head embedded in a pearl-like sphere, which uses the cloud to prevent intruders from finding it or revealing its existence. He accidentally shoots and damages the sphere, causing the cloud to start disintegrating, and hastily fashions the balloon's envelope into a parachute so he can jump off. Having reflected on the events in his personal life that led up to the skydiving flight, he gains a new appreciation for life during the fall. Landing safely on a rural road, he learns from a passing motorist that he is now in New Hampshire and sets out to find a telephone so he can let his mother know that he has survived.

=== Rain ===
On a hot August day in Boulder, Colorado, crystalline spikes rain down from the storm clouds, killing nearly everyone outdoors. A woman named Honeysuckle Speck survives, having been in a garage and looking after her young neighbor Templeton Blake, but her girlfriend Yolanda Rusted and Yolanda's mother are among the dead. The rain of "nails" (later determined to be a form of fulgurite) proves to have occurred over much of the world, causing millions of deaths and throwing human civilization into chaos. Honeysuckle walks thirty miles to Denver, intending to tell Yolanda's father about the deaths of his wife and daughter, but discovers upon arrival that he has been murdered. One of his homophobic neighbors attacks her; realizing that he is the killer, she subdues him, locks him in a car trunk, and alerts the authorities.

Upon returning to Boulder, Honeysuckle discovers that the deadly rain was caused by Templeton's mother Ursula, bitter over the decision of her late husband's employers to relocate to Georgia and steal his chemical research. She has used his work to seed the clouds and planted evidence to frame terrorists in Georgia for the disaster, leading the president of the United States to obliterate the country in a nuclear strike. Ursula dies in a downpour, trying to protect Templeton from the nails; he is badly wounded but survives. Honeysuckle reflects on both the horror Ursula inflicted on the world and the sacrifice she made for her son, while hoping that the remnants of the world's scientific community can return the weather to normal someday.

== Reception ==
Kirkus referred to the collection as "sparkling" and concluded "Worth waiting in line for, if you're a Hill fan. If you're not, this is the book to turn you into one."

== Adaptations ==
- Rain (2022), a five-issue Syzygy Publishing/Image Comics series adapted by writer David M. Booher, illustrator Zoe Thorogood, and colorist Chris O’Halloran, based on Hill's novella Rain.
