= Joe Hill (writer) =

American author (born 1972)

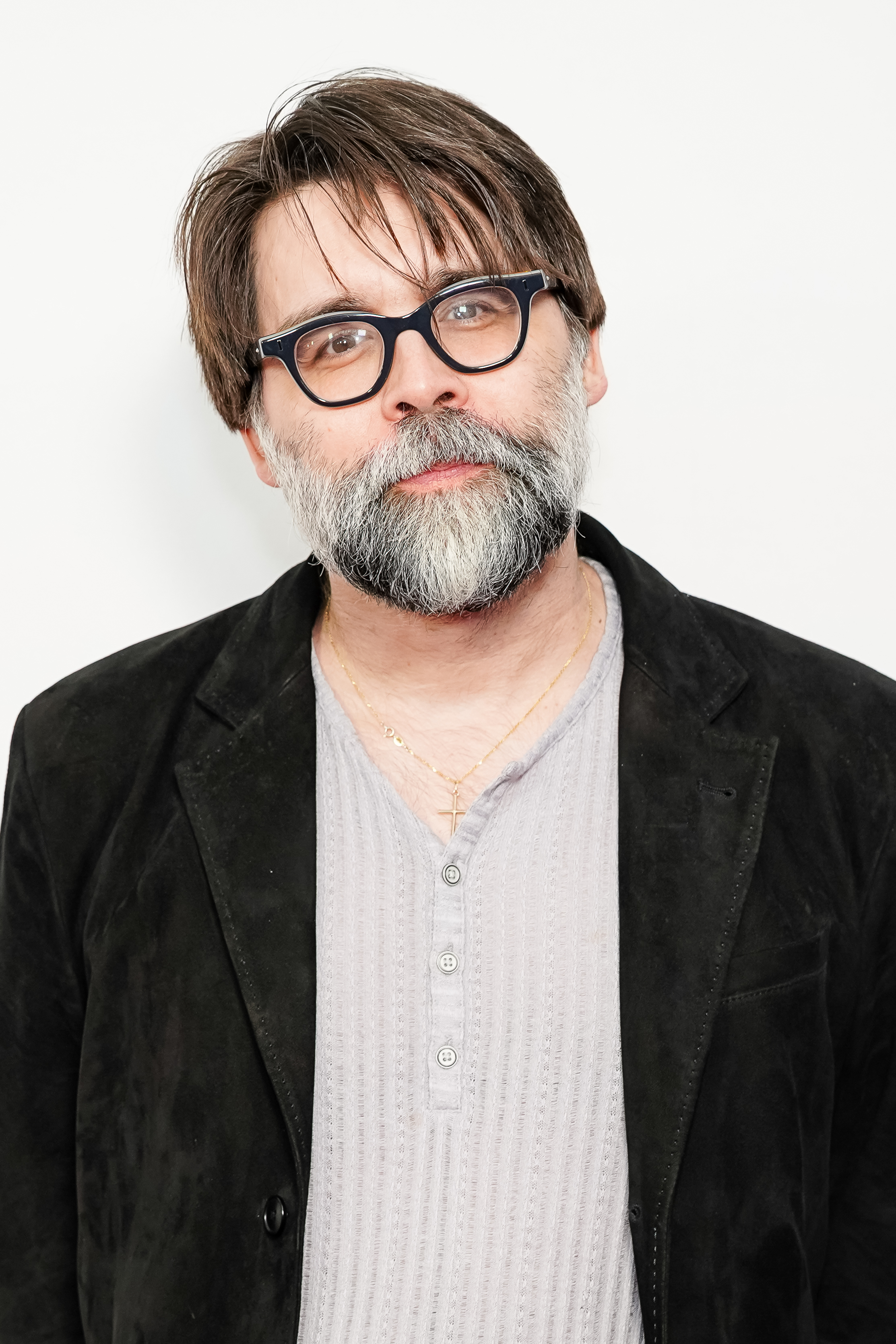
- Hill at Tribeca Festival in 2025
- Born: Joseph Hillstrom King; June 4, 1972 (age 54); Bangor, Maine, U.S.
- Education: Vassar College
- Occupations: Novelist; short story writer; comic book writer
- Spouses: Leanora King (m. 1999; div. 2010); Gillian Redfearn (m. 2018)
- Children: 5
- Parents: Stephen King (father); Tabitha King (mother)
- Relatives: Owen King (brother); Naomi King (sister)
- Writing career
- Period: 1996–present
- Genres: Horror, dark fantasy, science fiction
- Website: joehillfiction.com

Joseph Hillström King (born June 4, 1972), better known by the pen name Joe Hill, is an American writer. His work includes the novels Heart-Shaped Box (2007), Horns (2010), NOS4A2 (2013), The Fireman (2016) and King Sorrow (2025); the short story collections 20th Century Ghosts (2005) and Strange Weather (2017); and the comic book series Locke & Key (2008–2013). Hill has won numerous awards including Bram Stoker Awards, British Fantasy Awards, and an Eisner Award.

== Early life ==
Joe Hill was born in 1972 to authors Tabitha King (née Spruce) and Stephen King. He was born and grew up in Bangor, Maine. His younger brother Owen King is also a writer, and his older sibling Naomi King is a Unitarian minister.

At age nine, he appeared in the 1982 film Creepshow, directed by George A. Romero, which co-starred and was written by his father.

== Career ==
Hill chose to use an abbreviated form of his middle name for his professional surname in 1997, out of a desire to succeed based solely on his own merits rather than as the son of one of the world's best-selling and most-recognized living novelists. After achieving a degree of independent success, Hill publicly confirmed his identity in 2007, the year his first novel came out, after an article the previous year in Variety reported his identity.

Hill is a recipient of the Ray Bradbury Fellowship. He has also received the William L. Crawford award for best new fantasy writer in 2006, the A. E. Coppard Long Fiction Prize in 1999 for "Better Than Home", and the 2006 World Fantasy Award—Novella for "Voluntary Committal". His stories have appeared in a variety of magazines, such as Subterranean Magazine, Postscripts and The High Plains Literary Review, and in many anthologies, including The Mammoth Book of Best New Horror (ed. Stephen Jones) and The Year's Best Fantasy and Horror (ed. Ellen Datlow, Kelly Link and Gavin Grant).

Hill's first book, the limited edition collection 20th Century Ghosts (published in 2005 by PS Publishing), showcases fourteen of his short stories and won the Bram Stoker Award for Best Fiction Collection, together with the British Fantasy Award for Best Collection and Best Short Story for "Best New Horror". In October 2007, Hill's mainstream US and UK publishers reprinted 20th Century Ghosts, without the extras published in the 2005 slipcased versions, but including one new story.

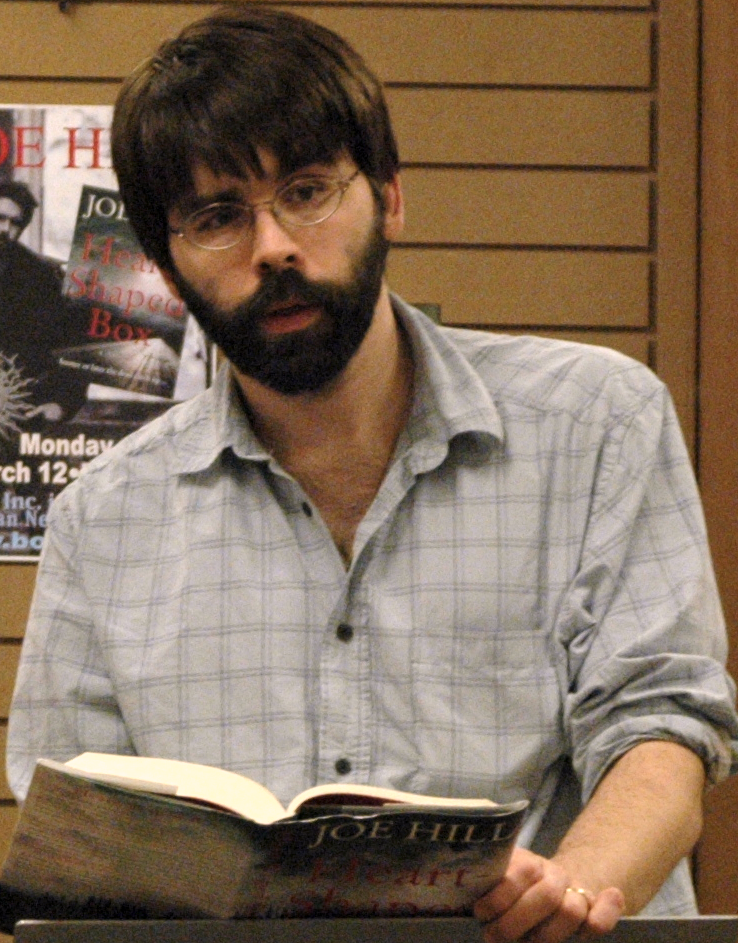
Hill at a book store reading in March 2007

Hill's first novel, Heart-Shaped Box, was published by William Morrow/HarperCollins in February, 2007 and by Victor Gollancz Ltd in UK the following month. The novel reached number eight on the New York Times bestseller list on April 1, 2007. In September, 2007, at the thirty-first Fantasycon, the British Fantasy Society awarded Hill the first ever Sydney J. Bounds Best Newcomer Award. In 2008, Hill's comic book series Locke & Key was released. The first issue, released on February 20, 2008, sold out its initial publication run in one day. A collection of the series in limited form from Subterranean Press sold out within 24 hours of being announced.

Hill's second novel, Horns, was published in February 2010. A film based on the novel was released in 2014, directed by Alexandre Aja and starring Daniel Radcliffe and Juno Temple. NOS4A2, his third novel, was published in April 2013. The novel peaked at number five on the New York Times Best Seller list. Hill's fourth novel, The Fireman, was released in May 2016. It entered the New York Times Best Seller list at number one, making it his highest-ranked novel.

In 2019, In the Tall Grass, co-written with his father Stephen King, was released as a Netflix Original film. Filming for the Locke & Key TV series, also by Netflix, began in the middle of January 2019 and the first season aired in February 2020. AMC began broadcasting a TV series of NOS4A2 in July 2019. The first season of Creepshow, released in September 2019, featured an adaptation of Hill's short story "By the Silver Waters of Lake Champlain".

Following DC Comics's announcement in June 2019 that it would suspend publication of its Vertigo Comics imprint, they announced that Hill would oversee and share the writing for a new horror line, Hill House Comics. which Hill had begun discussing with editor Mark Doyle in 2017. The line was originally to be titled Vertigo Fall, then Joe Hill's Vertigo Fall, before being given its eventual name.

Among Hill's unpublished works is one partly completed story with his father ("But Only Darkness Loves Me"), which is held with the Stephen King papers at the Special Collections Unit of the Raymond H Fogler Library at the University of Maine in Orono, Maine.

== Personal life ==
In 1999, Joe Hill married Leanora Legrand, whom he met at Vassar College. They have three children. The couple divorced in 2010.

In 2018, he married British publisher Gillian Redfearn. Their twins were born in 2022.

== Awards ==
Awards for Joe Hill
Work	Year & Award	Category	Result	Ref.
Better Than Home	2000 A. E. Coppard Long Fiction Prize		Won	
My Father's Mask	2005 International Horror Guild Award	Intermediate Form	Nominated	
Voluntary Committal	2005 International Horror Guild Award	Long Fiction	Nominated	
Voluntary Committal	2006 Locus Award	Novella	Nominated	
Voluntary Committal	2006 British Fantasy Award	Novella	Nominated	
Voluntary Committal	2006 World Fantasy Award	Novella	Won	
20th Century Ghosts	2005 International Horror Guild Award	Collection	Won	
20th Century Ghosts	2005 Bram Stoker Award	Fiction Collection	Won	
20th Century Ghosts	2006 Locus Award	Collection	Nominated	
20th Century Ghosts	2006 British Fantasy Award	Collection	Won	
20th Century Ghosts	2006 Crawford Award	New Fantasy Writer	Won	
20th Century Ghosts	2006 World Fantasy Award	Collection	Nominated	
20th Century Ghosts	2008 Audie Awards	Short Stories or Collections	Won	
20th Century Ghosts	2010 Tähtifantasia Award		Nominated	
Best New Horror	2005 Bram Stoker Award	Long Fiction	Won	
Best New Horror	2006 Locus Award	Short Story	Nominated	
Best New Horror	2006 British Fantasy Award	Short Story	Won	
Best New Horror	2006 World Fantasy Award	Short Fiction	Nominated	
The Black Phone	2005 British Fantasy Award	Short Fiction	Nominated	
You Will Hear the Locust Sing	2005 British Fantasy Award	Short Fiction	Nominated	
Heart-Shaped Box	2007 Bram Stoker Award	First Novel	Won	
Heart-Shaped Box	2007 Bram Stoker Award	Novel	Nominated	
Heart-Shaped Box	2007 Black Quill Award	Dark Genre Novel (Reader's Choice)	Won	
Heart-Shaped Box	2008 Macavity Awards	First Mystery Novel	Nominated	
Heart-Shaped Box	2008 Locus Award	First Novel	Won	
Heart-Shaped Box	2008 British Fantasy Award	August Derleth Award	Nominated	
Heart-Shaped Box	2008 Audie Awards	Thriller or Suspense	Won	
Heart-Shaped Box	2008 International Thriller Writers Award	First Novel	Won	
Thumbprint	2007 Shirley Jackson Award	Novelette	Nominated	
Thumbprint	2008 British Fantasy Award	Short Fiction	Nominated	
Locke & Key (with Gabriel Rodriguez)	2008 Rondo Hatton Classic Horror Award	Best Horror Comic Book	Honorable Mention	
Locke & Key (with Gabriel Rodriguez)	2009 Eisner Awards	Best Writer	Nominated	
Locke & Key (with Gabriel Rodriguez)	2009 British Fantasy Award	Comic/Graphic Novel	Won	
Locke & Key (with Gabriel Rodriguez)	2011 Eisner Awards	Best Writer	Won	
Locke & Key (with Gabriel Rodriguez)	2012 British Fantasy Award	Comic/Graphic Novel	Nominated	
Locke & Key (with Gabriel Rodriguez)	2015 Mythopoeic Awards	Adult Literature	Nominated	
Locke & Key (with Gabriel Rodriguez)	2016 Audie Awards	Original Work	Nominated	
Gunpowder	2009 British Fantasy Award	Novella	Nominated	
Bobby Conroy Comes Back from the Dead	2010 Tähtifantasia Award		Nominated	
Horns	2010 Bram Stoker Award	Novel	Nominated	
Horns	2011 RUSA CODES Reading List	Horror	Shortlisted	
Horns	2011 Locus Award	Fantasy Novel	Nominated	
The Cape	2011 Eisner Award	Single Issue/One-Shot	Nominated	
Locke & Key: Keys to the Kingdom #1: Sparrow	2011 Eisner Awards	Single Issue/One-Shot	Nominated	
Locke and Key, Vol. 4: Keys to the Kingdom (with Gabriel Rodriguez)	2011 Goodreads Choice Awards	Graphic Novels & Comics	Nominated	
Locke and Key, Vol. 4: Keys to the Kingdom (with Gabriel Rodriguez)	2011 Bram Stoker Award	Graphic Novel	Nominated	
Locke and Key, Vol. 4: Keys to the Kingdom (with Gabriel Rodriguez)	2012 Hugo Award	Graphic Story	Nominated	
Locke and Key, Vol. 4: Keys to the Kingdom (with Gabriel Rodriguez)	2012 British Fantasy Award	Comic/Graphic Novel	Won	
Locke & Key: Guide to the Known Keys	2012 Eisner Awards	Single Issue/One-Shot	Nominated	
Locke and Key, Vol. 5: Clockworks (with Gabriel Rodriguez)	2012 Goodreads Choice Awards	Graphic Novels & Comics	Nominated	
Locke and Key, Vol. 5: Clockworks (with Gabriel Rodriguez)	2013 Hugo Award	Graphic Story	Nominated	
NOS4A2	2013 Goodreads Choice Awards	Horror	Nominated	
NOS4A2	2013 Bram Stoker Award	Novel	Nominated	
NOS4A2	2014 British Fantasy Award	August Derleth Award	Nominated	
NOS4A2	2014 Locus Award	Fantasy Novel	Nominated	
NOS4A2	2014 Lord Ruthven Award	Fiction	Won	
The Devil on the Staircase	2013 FantLab's Book of the Year Award	Translated Novella or Short Story	Nominated	
Locke & Key Vol. 6: Alpha and Omega (with Gabriel Rodriguez)	2014 Bram Stoker Award	Graphic Novel	Nominated	
Locke & Key Vol. 6: Alpha and Omega (with Gabriel Rodriguez)	2014 Goodreads Choice Awards	Graphic Novels & Comics	Nominated	
The Fireman	2016 Goodreads Choice Awards	Horror	Won	
The Fireman	2017 Locus Award	Horror Novel	Won	
The Fireman	2017 RUSA CODES Reading List	Horror	Shortlisted	
The Fireman	2018 Premio Ignotus	Foreign Novel	Nominated	
Strange Weather	2017 Bram Stoker Award	Fiction Collection	Won	
Strange Weather	2017 Goodreads Choice Awards	Horror	Nominated	
Strange Weather	2018 Locus Award	Collection	Nominated	
Strange Weather	2018 British Fantasy Award	Collection	Won	
You Are Released	2018 Bram Stoker Award	Long Fiction	Nominated	
Full Throttle	2019 Goodreads Choice Awards	Horror	Nominated	
Full Throttle	2020 Audie Awards	Short Stories or Collections	Won	
Full Throttle	2020 Locus Award	Collection	Nominated	
Basketful of Heads	2020 Goodreads Choice Awards	Graphic Novels & Comics	Nominated	
Basketful of Heads #1	2020 British Fantasy Award	Comic/Graphic Novel	Nominated	
Late Returns	2020 Locus Award	Novelette	Nominated	
Late Returns	2020 Shirley Jackson Award	Novella	Nominated	
Rain	2023 Eisner Awards	Adaptation from Another Medium	Nominated	
The Pram	2024 Shirley Jackson Award	Novelette	Nominated	
King Sorrow	2025 Bram Stoker Award	Best Novel	Nominated	
King Sorrow	2026 Dragon Awards	Horror Novel	Won	
	2007 British Fantasy Award	Sydney J. Bounds Award Best Newcomer	Won	

== Bibliography ==
=== Novels ===
- Heart-Shaped Box (2007)
- Horns (2010)
- NOS4A2 (2013) (published as NOS4R2 in the United Kingdom)
- The Fireman (2016)
- King Sorrow (2025)
- Hunger (2027)

=== Short stories ===
==== All short stories ====
All short stories (dates by original magazine or anthology publication):

- "The Lady Rests" (1997), Palace Corbie 7
- "The Collaborators" (1998), Implosion 8
- "Better Than Home" (1999), A. E. Coppard Long Fiction Prize Series, stand-alone chapbook
- "The Saved" (2001), The Clackamas Literary Review spring/summer issue
- "Pop Art" (2001), With Signs & Wonders, Invisible Cities Press anthology
- "20th Century Ghost" (2002), The High Plains Literary Review, journal's final issue
- "The Widow's Breakfast" (2002), The Clackamas Literary Review spring/summer issue
- "You Will Hear the Locust Sing" (2004), The Third Alternative 37
- "Abraham's Boys" (2004), The Many Faces of Van Helsing, anthology
- "The Black Phone" (2004), The Third Alternative 39
- "Dead-Wood" (2005), Subterranean Press February online newsletter
- "Last Breath" (2005), Subterranean Magazine 2
- "Best New Horror" (2005), Postscripts 3
- "Voluntary Committal" (2005), Subterranean Press stand-alone chapbook
- "In the Rundown" (2005), Crimewave 8
- "Scheherazade's Typewriter" (2005), 20th Century Ghosts, within the book's acknowledgments section
- "The Cape" (2005), 20th Century Ghosts, original to collection
- "My Father's Mask" (2005), 20th Century Ghosts, original to collection
- "Bobby Conroy Comes Back from the Dead" (2005), Postscripts 5
- "Thumbprint" (2007), Postscripts 10
- "Jude Confronts Global Warming" (2007), Subterranean Press online magazine, spring issue
- "Gunpowder" (2008), PS Publishing stand-alone novella
- "Throttle" (2009, written in collaboration with Stephen King), He Is Legend: An Anthology Celebrating Richard Matheson (also included in the audiobook Road Rage)
- "Twittering from the Circus of the Dead" (2010), The New Dead, edited by Christopher Golden
- "The Devil on the Staircase" (2010), Stories: All-New Tales, edited by Al Sarrantonio and Neil Gaiman
- "Wolverton Station" (2011), Subterranean: Tales of Dark Fantasy 2, edited by William Schafer
- "In the Tall Grass" (2012, written in collaboration with Stephen King), Esquire, June/July and August issues
- "By the Silver Water of Lake Champlain" (2012), Shadow Show: All New Stories in Celebration of Ray Bradbury, edited by Mort Castle and Sam Weller
- "Snapshot, 1988" (2016); or "Snapshot" (2017), Strange Weather 1
- "Loaded" (2017), Strange Weather 2
- "Aloft" (2017), Strange Weather 3
- "Rain" (2017), Strange Weather 4
- "All I Care About Is You" (2017), The Weight of Words, edited by Dave McKean and William Schafer
- "Dark Carousel" (2018), vinyl-first audiobook (Collected in Full Throttle)
- "You Are Released" (2018), Flight or Fright, edited by Stephen King and Bev Vincent
- "Faun" (2019), At Home in the Dark, edited by Lawrence Block
- "Late Returns", collected in Full Throttle
- "Mums", collected in Full Throttle
- "The Pram" (2023), Amazon Original Stories (part of the Creature Feature set)
- "A Sign of the Times" (2023), Subterranean Press
- "Ushers" (2024)
- "Jackknife" (2025), Amazon Original Stories (part of the Shivers collection)

==== Collections and uncollected short stories ====
Collections:

- 20th Century Ghosts (2005), collection of 8 short stories, 9 novelettes and 1 novella:
  "Best New Horror", "20th Century Ghost", "Pop Art", "You Will Hear the Locust Sing", "Abraham's Boys", "Better Than Home", "The Black Phone", "In The Rundown", "The Cape", "Last Breath", "Dead-Wood", "The Widow's Breakfast", "My Father's Mask", "Voluntary Committal", "Bobby Conroy Comes Back from the Dead", "The Saved", "The Black Phone: The Missing Chapter", "Scheherazade's Typewriter"
- Strange Weather (2017), collection of 4 novellas:
  "Snapshot", "Loaded", "Aloft", "Rain"
- Full Throttle (2019), collection of 4 short stories, 9 novelettes and 1 novella:
  "Throttle" (novelette, with Stephen King), "Dark Carousel" (novelette), "Wolverton Station", "By the Silver Water of Lake Champlain" (novelette), "Faun" (novelette), "Late Returns" (novelette), "All I Care About Is You" (novelette), "Thumbprint" (novelette), "The Devil on the Staircase", "Twittering from the Circus of the Dead", "Mums" (novelette), "In the Tall Grass" (novella, with Stephen King), "You Are Released" (novelette), "A Little Sorrow"

Uncollected short stories:

- "The Lady Rests" (1997), Palace Corbie 7
- "The Collaborators" (1998), Implosion 8
- "Jude Confronts Global Warming" (2007), Subterranean Press online magazine, spring issue
- "Gunpowder" (2008), PS Publishing stand-alone novella

=== Comics ===
- Locke & Key (2008–2013), illustrated by Gabriel Rodriguez
- Kodiak (2010), one-shot, co-written with Jason Ciaramella and illustrated by Nat Jones
- The Cape series, co-written with Jason Ciaramella, based on the short story "The Cape":
  1. The Cape (2007), illustrated by Zach Howard:
    The Cape (2010), one-shot
    The Cape (2011), mini-series
  2. The Cape: 1969 (2012), prequel, mini-series, illustrated by Nelson Daniel
  3. The Cape: Fallen (2018), mini-series, illustrated by Zach Howard
- Thumbprint (2013), co-written with Jason Ciaramella
- Wraith: Welcome to Christmasland (2014), mini-series, illustrated by C. P. Wilson III
- Shadow Show: Stories in Celebration of Ray Bradbury: "By the Silver Water of Lake Champlain" (2014), one-shot, adapted by Jason Ciaramella and illustrated by C. P. Wilson III
- Tales from the Darkside (2016), illustrated by Gabriel Rodriguez
- Basketful of Heads (2019), mini-series, illustrated by Leomacs
- Plunge (2019), mini-series, illustrated by Stuart Immonen
- Sea Dogs (2019), mini-series
- Dying is Easy (2020), illustrated by Martin Simmonds
- Rain (2022), mini-series, adapted by David M. Booher and illustrated by Zoe Thorogood, based on the novella Rain
- Creepshow: Joe Hill's Wolverton Station (2024), one-shot, co-adapted with Jason Ciaramella and illustrated by Michael Walsh

=== Poetry ===
- "The Sundial Man" (2010)

=== Non-fiction ===
- A Little Silver Book of Sharp Shiny Slivers (2017), collection of essays

=== Anthology appearances ===
Below is a list of Hill's short fiction which has been reprinted.

- "20th Century Ghost": "The Mammoth Book of Best New Horror, Volume Fourteen" (2003), ed. Stephen Jones
- "My Father's Mask": "The Year's Best Fantasy and Horror, 19th Annual Collection" (2006), ed. Ellen Datlow, Kelly Link and Gavin Grant
- "Best New Horror": "The Mammoth Book of Best New Horror, Volume Seventeen" (2006), ed. Stephen Jones
- "The Cape": "Horror: The Best of the Year, 2006 Edition" (2006), ed. John Gregory Betancourt and Sean Wallace
- "Thumbprint": "The Mammoth Book of Best New Horror, Volume Nineteen" (2008), ed. Stephen Jones
- "Bobby Conroy Comes Back from the Dead": "The Living Dead" (2008), ed. John Joseph Adams
- "20th Century Ghost": "Poe's Children: The New Horror" (2008), ed. Peter Straub
- "Pop Art": "American Fantastic Tales: Terror and the Uncanny from the 1940s to Now" (2009), ed. Peter Straub
- "Abraham's Boys": "By Blood We Live" (2009), ed. John Joseph Adams
- "20th Century Ghost": "The Mammoth Book of the Best of Best New Horror" (2010), ed. Stephen Jones
- "My Father's Mask": " Darkness: Two Decades of Modern Horror " (2010), ed. Ellen Datlow
- "Throttle" (with Stephen King): "The Mammoth Book of Best New Horror, Volume Twenty-One" (2010), ed. Stephen Jones
- "You Are Released": Flight or Fright (2018), ed. Stephen King and Bev Vincent

=== Miscellaneous credits ===
- "Pop Art" was reprinted in 2007 by Subterranean Press as a chapbook featuring illustrations by Gahan Wilson. As well, 52 lettered (A–ZZ) hard covers and 150 numbered soft covered chapbooks were signed by Hill.
- "Fanboyz", a comic script, was written for Spider-Man Unlimited 8 (2005). The story was illustrated by Seth Fisher.
- "The Saved", first published in The Clackamas Literary Review in 2001 and also as part of the bonus material included in the 2005 deluxe slipcased edition of 20th Century Ghosts, was reprinted in December 2007 as part of PS Publishing's annual Holiday Chapbook series, available, free of charge, to subscribers of the quarterly magazine Postscripts.
- "Thumbprint", first published in Postscripts #10 in 2007, was reprinted as a chapbook in summer 2008 to accompany the anthology Subterranean: Tales of Dark Fantasy published by Subterranean Press.
- Hill was selected to serve as the guest editor of the first (2015) volume of Houghton Mifflin Harcourt's series The Best American Science Fiction and Fantasy.
- Tales from the Darkside: Script Book was published in 2016 collecting three original scrips of the failed TV series reboot.
- The Fireman was referenced in Episode 0 of the podcast Point Mystic, which also featured Joe Hill's voice and likeness.

== Screenwriting credits ==
- Fade Away (2005) (unproduced screenplay co-written with Owen King)
- Tales From The Darkside (2015) (unproduced pilot episode)
- Locke & Key (2018) (unaired pilot episode)
- Locke & Key (2019) (2 episodes, including pilot episode co-written with Eli Coleite)

== Adaptations ==
- Pop Art (2008), short film directed by Amanda Boyle, based on short story "Pop Art"
- Abraham's Boys (2009), short film directed by Dorothy Street, based on short story "Abraham's Boys"
- Locke & Key (2011), TV pilot for Fox directed by Mark Romanek, based on comic Locke & Key
- Horns (2013), film directed by Alexandre Aja, based on novel Horns
- Locke & Key (2017), TV pilot for Hulu, based on comic Locke & Key
- In the Tall Grass (2019), film directed by Vincenzo Natali, based on novella "In the Tall Grass"
- "By the Silver Water of Lake Champlain" (2019), segment of series Creepshow, directed by Tom Savini, based on novelette "By the Silver Water of Lake Champlain"
- NOS4A2 (2019–2020), series created by Jami O'Brien, based on novel NOS4A2
- Locke & Key (2020–2022), series created by Carlton Cuse, Meredith Averill and Aron Eli Coleite, based on comic Locke & Key
- "Twittering from the Circus of the Dead" (2020), segment of series Creepshow, directed by Greg Nicotero, based on short story "Twittering from the Circus of the Dead"
- The Black Phone (2021), film directed by Scott Derrickson, based on short story "The Black Phone"; and its sequel Black Phone 2 (2025) based on an idea by Joe Hill.
- "Mums" (2021), segment of series Creepshow, directed by Rusty Cundieff, based on novelette "Mums"
- Abraham's Boys (2025)
