= Throttle (novella) =

Novella by Joe Hill and Stephen King

- Cover of the 2012 HarperCollins Publishers edition
- Author: Joe Hill; Stephen King
- Language: English
- Publisher: Gauntlet Press
- Publication date: 2009
- Publication place: United States
- Media type: Print

Throttle is a novella written by Joe Hill and Stephen King. It was published in February 2009 by Gauntlet Press in a limited edition anthology honoring Richard Matheson titled He Is Legend, and in a mass-market audiobook titled Road Rage, also containing Matheson's short story "Duel", which served as inspiration for Throttle. A comic book adaptation by IDW Publishing was published in the spring of 2012.

Throttle has been published in Full Throttle, a 2019 collection of short fiction by Hill.

== Plot ==
The Tribe, an outlaw motorcycle club operating in Nevada and led by Vince Adamson, is fleeing the scene of a double murder. Dean Clarke, an associate of Vince's son and fellow club member John, had set up a meth lab using $60,000 of the club's money. The lab caught fire and was destroyed, and the Tribe found Dean and his girlfriend at a cabin in the hills as they were preparing to flee and killed them both. However, John (nicknamed "Race") is convinced that Dean gave some of the money to his sister for safekeeping and is determined to track her down in Show Low, Arizona, and retrieve it.

As members of the Tribe discuss the situation outside a diner, a tanker truck pulls away. The driver later lets them pass him on the road, but eventually catches up and begins attacking them with his truck, striking and killing five. One survivor flees while another suffers a mechanical breakdown, leaving only Vince, Race, and fellow member Lemmy to continue the battle. Vince throws a flash-bang grenade into the cab, incapacitating the driver enough to cause a crash and explosion that kills him. Lemmy recovers a photograph from the cab and shows it to Vince, who realizes that Dean's girlfriend had been the driver's daughter. He had been on his way to visit her at Dean's cabin, overheard the Tribe discussing the murders outside the diner, and concluded that they had killed her; he struck in order to avenge her death.

Vince warns Race not to stop in Show Low, as he intends to tell the local police to watch for any threats against Dean's sister. Race departs, leaving Vince and Lemmy to watch the tanker burn.

== Film adaptation ==
On March 30, 2017, Army of One producer Emile Gladstone announced that he would produce a film based on the short story with John Scott III writing. On May 13, 2020, it was announced that HBO Max would distribute the film with David S. Goyer and Keith Levene producing through Phantom Four and Leigh Dana Jackson writing.

== See also ==
- Stephen King short fiction bibliography
