= Heart-Shaped Box (novel) =

2007 novel by Joe Hill

- Cover of US edition
- Author: Joe Hill
- Cover artist: Susan Young
- Language: English
- Genre: Horror fiction
- Publisher: William Morrow
- Publication date: February 13, 2007
- Publication place: United States
- Media type: Print (Hardback)
- Pages: 400
- ISBN: 978-0-06-114793-7
- OCLC: 69734622
- Dewey Decimal: 813/.6 22
- LC Class: PS3608.I4342 H43 2007

Heart-Shaped Box is the debut horror novel by American author Joe Hill. The book was published on February 13, 2007, by William Morrow.

The title of the novel and its four sections are all those of rock songs: "Heart-Shaped Box" by Nirvana, "Black Dog" by Led Zeppelin, "Ride On" by AC/DC, "Hurt" by Nine Inch Nails, and "Alive" by Pearl Jam.

== Synopsis ==
Aging rock star Judas Coyne spends his retirement collecting morbid memorabilia, including a witch's confession, a real snuff film and, after being sent an email directly about the item online, a dead man's funeral suit. Jude is informed by Jessica Price, the dead man's daughter, that the old man's spirit is attached to the suit, so that Jude is effectively buying a ghost. Jude cannot pass up this creepy opportunity.

The suit arrives in a heart-shaped box. Various odd occurrences cause Jude to realize that the ghost is deadly and means to kill him and those around him. His assistant, Danny Wooten, kills himself, but not before contacting the woman who sent the suit. Jude finds out that the ghost was the stepfather of his ex girlfriend, Florida, with whom Jude lived for a few months and who later committed suicide. The ghost holds Jude responsible for Florida's death and wants revenge. Jude flees his house with his current girlfriend, Georgia, with the ghost in pursuit.

The ghost intends to separate Jude from his two dogs, Angus and Bon, who, as familiars, can protect their owners from the dead. Jude and Georgia take the dogs with them while fleeing south. The dogs save them several times, but the ghost eventually succeeds. Jude and Georgia discover that Florida had been hypnotised and molested by her stepfather, Craddock McDermott. When Florida threatened to turn in Craddock and her elder sister Jessica to the police, they killed her and staged her death as a suicide. Later, a dying Craddock hexed the suit and arranged for Jessica to sell it to Jude.

After a series of gory battles between Jude and Craddock, Georgia finds a way to contact Florida beyond the grave for help fighting her stepfather's ghost. In the end, Craddock is vanquished, freeing Jude and Georgia from his curse, and Jessica is sent to jail. After surviving the horrendous ordeal, Jude and Georgia eventually marry.

== Publication ==
Hill received a great deal of attention with the publication of Heart-Shaped Box. Subterranean Press published the advance edition of 500 copies and they sold out within days, long before publication. The limited signed and numbered 200 copies and 15 lettered copies are sought after by Joe Hill book collectors. A second printing of the limited edition was announced by Subterranean Press on April 14, 2007, and released in May 2007. The second printing sold out within hours of being announced. Hill went on an international tour promoting his book which ended in April 2007.

== Reception ==
Heart-Shaped Box peaked on The New York Times bestseller list at #8, Heart-Shaped Box won the 2007 Bram Stoker Award for Best First Novel. It was reviewed by the New York Times and Time magazine, which praised its characterization and lack of sentimentality.

== Adaptations ==
The film rights to Heart-Shaped Box were acquired by Warner Bros. in 2007 to be produced by Akiva Goldsman. Irish director Neil Jordan wrote the script and was slated to direct. The project stalled in development hell.
