= Horns (novel) =

2010 dark fantasy novel by Joe Hill

Horns: A Novel
- Author: Joe Hill
- Language: English
- Genre: Contemporary fantasy Gothic fiction Supernatural fiction Horror fiction
- Publisher: William Morrow
- Publication date: February 16, 2010
- Publication place: United States
- Media type: Print (hardcover)
- Pages: 370
- ISBN: 978-0-06-114795-1
- OCLC: 419855424

Horns is a 2010 dark fantasy novel by Joe Hill and is the author's second published novel. The novel also incorporates elements of contemporary fantasy, crime fiction, and Gothic fiction. It employs the third-person omniscient, nonlinear narrative in telling the story of Ig Perrish, who—in the aftermath of his girlfriend Merrin Williams' mysterious rape and murder—awakes one morning to find horns growing from his head and diabolical powers at his command. The novel consists of fifty chapters grouped into five sections of ten chapters each, named as follows: "Hell", "Cherry", "The Fire Sermon", "The Fixer", and "The Gospel According to Mick and Keith".

== Plot summary ==
After a drunken night in the woods containing an old foundry, near where his girlfriend's corpse was discovered, twenty-six-year-old Ignatius "Ig" Perrish wakes up one morning to find that he has sprouted bony, sensitive horns from his temples. Ig is the second son of a renowned musician and the younger brother of a rising late-night TV star, Terry Perrish. Ig had position and security within his hometown of Gideon, New Hampshire, but the rape and murder of his girlfriend, Merrin Williams, changed all that. Despite his innocence, and although he was neither charged nor tried, Ig is largely considered guilty in public opinion.

As Ig leaves the apartment he shares with Glenna Nicholson, a childhood acquaintance of his whom he occasionally has sex with, he notices that she is strangely honest with him about her innermost desires, especially admitting to have performed oral sex on a mutual high school friend of theirs, Lee Tourneau, the previous night. When Ig goes to a medical clinic to deal with the growth of his horns, other people blatantly admit to him their darkest urges and that no one seems surprised to see the horns. Also, physical contact with people allows him to know their identities and some of their darkest secrets. Throughout the day he makes people give in to the ugly urges: including two police officers, his church's priest and a nun, and others. Going home, he discovers that his parents and grandmother secretly detest him, believing that he killed Merrin. He then meets his brother, Terry, who admits under the horns' power that Lee Tourneau was Merrin's killer. A furious Ig releases the brake on his grandmother's wheelchair and she goes rushing down a slope and crashes.

Back in his high school years, Ig becomes infatuated with Merrin at church when she flirtatiously reflects light off her cross necklace into his eyes. She mistakenly leaves the necklace which Ig finds and, noticing that it's broken, resolves to fix it. Later Ig and Terry go to the foundry where other teens hang out. There, Eric Hannity bets that if anyone rides naked down a perilous trail in the woods, he will give them a cherry bomb that he and Terry have been playing with over the summer. Ig agrees to the bet, but he crashes into the river. Ig survives, believing that Lee pulled him out of the water and resuscitated him. Ig and Lee immediately become friends. When Lee also expresses an interest in Merrin and shows him how to fix the necklace, Ig lets him have it instead. Later, Ig trades his cherry bomb with Lee in order to get back the cross. Ig and Merrin eventually begin dating. Lee detonates the cherry bomb and damages his eye. Not only does Ig feel responsible for Lee's accident, but that Merrin should not go to the hospital with him to visit Lee, because Ig thinks it would be tantamount to gloating their relationship in Lee's face.

On the night of Merrin's murder, she attempts to break things off with Ig. Merrin explains that Ig, who is about to go to England for six months for his job, should openly pursue other women while there, in order to gain some more romantic experience. This infuriates Ig, who accuses her of cheating on him. He drives away from the restaurant, leaving her in the rain. He is later arrested at the airport.

Back in the present, Ig goes to the congressman's office where Lee works to make him admit that he killed Merrin. However, he is unable to manipulate Lee with the horns. He also cannot attack Lee because of the congressman's security team, which includes Eric Hannity. Driving back to the foundry, Ig notices that snakes have started congregating around him. He listens to voicemails left by his friends and family, discovering that they have no memory of interacting with him while under the mysterious influence of his horns. He drives back to his and Glenna's apartment where he is attacked by Eric, just narrowly escaping.

Returning to his parents' home, Ig touches a sleeping Terry's wrist and suddenly sees the events of the night of Merrin's murder through his eyes. Terry was riding in Lee's car when they pick up Merrin, but is drunk and high and passes out while the actual murder takes place. Later, Lee threatens Terry to keep quiet and five months later unsuccessfully attempts suicide. Although Terry begins to wake up, Ig mimics their mother's voice and tells Terry to return to Los Angeles before departing. Ig returns to the foundry where he delivers a drunken speech to the snakes. The following morning Ig is abruptly assaulted by Lee, and the contact with him enlightens Ig as to just how Lee murdered Merrin. Ig removes Merrin's cross from Lee's neck, leaving him exposed to the horns' influence. Lee tosses Ig into the latter's AMC Gremlin, douses the car with gasoline, and lights it on fire before it crashes into the river. Ig emerges unharmed but naked, the fire having healed him and made his skin redder.

In another flashback, Merrin and Ig visit a mysterious treehouse in the woods filled with religious paraphernalia. The two have sex and then pray, when suddenly someone startles them by banging on the door in the floor of the treehouse. They quickly dress as the pounding continues, but when they open the door, no one is there. They are never able to relocate the tree house and begin to believe they both imagined it, dubbing it the "Treehouse of the Mind."

Lee's adult life working for a Christian conservative congressman and his sexual pursuit of Merrin is explored. His mother acquired dementia and became weak and confused. Lee uses this as an opportunity to torture her, while pretending to be a loving, caring son whenever anyone visits. Ultimately she dies, and he uses her death as an excuse to become close to Merrin. He consistently finds more meaning than is intended from Merrin's gestures and choice of words, believing her to be sexually interested in him and, knowing that Ig will soon be leaving for abroad, eager to begin an affair with her. In reality, however, she never had any romantic feelings for him. This realization leads him to rape and kill her. Lee also remembers an experience from his childhood in which he impaled himself with a pitchfork while attempting to feed and befriend a stray cat. He undergoes a hallucination in which he perceives things as God would, and murders the cat. From this point on, his personality is changed and he has psychopathic thoughts.

Back in the present, Ig finds an old skirt and black overcoat to wear in the woods. Taking Merrin's cross he sees Dale Williams, Merrin's father, among a small crowd that has formed near the burnt car. Dale, against his will, gives Ig a ride to the Williams house, and the two discuss their conflicts and the death of Regan Williams, Merrin's older sister, from breast cancer, long before Ig and Merrin ever met. Exploring the attic, Ig finds a group of papers written in Morse code and a mammogram that reveals that Merrin too had breast cancer. Returning to the foundry Ig deciphers the Morse code in which Merrin, knowing she will die from breast cancer, encourages him to find another romantic partner. She decided to break up with him and die on her own to spare him pain. Glenna arrives looking for Ig, whom he convinces to lead a more fulfilling life. He uses her cellphone to call Lee and, mimicking Glenna's voice, persuades him to drive to the foundry, where Ig hopes to ambush and kill him.

Terry unexpectedly arrives at the foundry as Ig begs for him to leave. Terry confesses that he has quit his job and will not abandon Ig. Lee arrives with Eric as backup, armed with guns and aware of Ig's trap, having talked to the real Glenna. Ig and Eric struggle for a time before Lee shoots and kills Eric, hoping that it will look as though Ig and Eric killed each other without Lee's involvement. Lee then beats Ig with the empty shotgun until Terry reappears, blasting his trumpet into Lee's ear. With this distraction, Ig finally slams his horns into Lee's body. He then telepathically convinces a snake to slide down Lee's throat, causing him to suffocate. As Terry goes to use Glenna's phone to call emergency services, he is bitten by a venomous snake that Ig had placed there to attack Lee.

Ig lights himself on fire to heal his body. As this happens, his memories from the night before he got his horns returns. In his inebriated state, he miraculously came across the elusive Treehouse of the Mind and while knocking on the trap door, discovered that he was the one the younger versions of himself and Merrin had heard knocking on the door all along. After climbing inside he set it on fire in a drunken rage. The house, resonating with his need to kill the person who murdered Merrin, gave him his powers and caused him to become devil-like. Back in the present time, Ig tells Terry that he needs to lie about what has happened and influences his mind. Ig wanders into the woods with a fire following him until he finds the treehouse. Ig ascends into the burning tree where he finds a wedding party within with Merrin awaiting him.

Sometime later, Terry is recuperating from his snakebite, believing that Eric and Lee killed Ig by burning him in his car, and that the two then tortured Terry with a venomous snake, before they killed each other. Although the detective doubts that this story is true, Terry is the only living witness. Terry meets with Glenna in the woods who states she is moving to New York City. As the two begin to leave, Terry believes he can hear the faint sound of a trumpet.

== Background ==
Hill has stated in interview that fantastical perception of secrets was a theme he had explored several times prior, never reaching the point of publication. He wrote an epic fantasy novel entitled The Fear Tree... in which a character was able to divine people's most closely guarded secrets. This concept was reworked for The Surrealist's Glass, wherein the protagonist acquired a magical lens which allowed him to see people's secrets. Hill describes The Surrealist's Glass as a "confused, corrupt, first draft of Horns" such that "several scenes in Horns appeared in a cruder earlier form in [The Surrealist's] Glass." According to Hill, "writers tend to revisit the same themes, tropes, places, and concerns, again and again, until they figure out how to use them in a satisfying way," and that he had "finally got it right with Horns... It just took a while for all the elements to gel."

== Reception ==
Horns was nominated for the 2010 Bram Stoker Award for Best Novel.

== Film adaptation ==
On June 16, 2012, it was announced via Joe Hill's personal website that Mandalay Pictures and Red Granite Pictures would be making Horns, with Alexandre Aja directing, Daniel Radcliffe starring as Ignatius Perrish and Juno Temple as Merrin Williams. Horns premiered at the 2013 Toronto International Film Festival and its US theatrical release was on October 31, 2014. Horns grossed a total of $3,347,106 worldwide in 31 days of release.
