= Locke & Key =

American comic book series

- Cover of Locke & Key: Welcome to Lovecraft #1 (February 2008), art by Gabriel Rodriguez

Publication information
- Publisher: IDW Publishing
- Schedule: Monthly
- Formats: Original material for the series has been published as a set of limited series.
- Genre: Dark Contemporary fantasy
- Publication date: Welcome to Lovecraft; February–July 2008; Head Games; January–June 2009; Crown of Shadows; November 2009 – April 2010; Keys to the Kingdom; August 2010 – March 2011; Clockworks; June 2011 – April 2012; Omega; November 2012 – June 2013; Alpha; September–December 2013
- Number of issues: 37 (original run); 8 (The Golden Age)

Creative team
- Writer(s): Joe Hill
- Artist(s): Gabriel Rodríguez
- Letterer(s): Robbie Robbins
- Colorist(s): Jay Fotos
- Editor(s): Chris Ryall

Reprints
- Collected editions
- Welcome to Lovecraft: ISBN 9781600102370
- Head Games: ISBN 9781600104831
- Crown of Shadows: ISBN 9781600106958
- Keys to the Kingdom: ISBN 9781600108860
- Clockworks: ISBN 9781613772270
- Alpha & Omega: ISBN 9781613778531

Locke & Key is an American comic book series written by Joe Hill, illustrated by Gabriel Rodríguez, and published by IDW Publishing.

== Plot summary ==
This plot is presented in chronological order.

In 1775 during the American Revolution, a group of Rebels, hiding in a sea cave in Massachusetts Bay beneath what will one day be Keyhouse in the town of Lovecraft, discover a portal to another dimension, the plains of Leng. It is filled with demons who can mesmerize anyone who sees them and possess them through touch; two men are possessed over two days, and they kill several rebels. However, when the demons attempt to enter the real world without possessing someone, they are transformed into "whispering" iron, which young smith Benjamin Locke forges into a variety of magical keys. The first key he makes is the Omega Key (which has an Omega character on the head) that seals the entrance to the dimension. The magic of the Keyhouse gradually evolves over the years, including a spell that causes occupants to forget about the keys and the magic of the house when they pass their 18th birthday. In 1988, a group of teenagers, having used the keys extensively in their high school years to their great delight, decide to open the black door with the Omega Key, hoping to trick a demon into entering the real world in order to provide more metal with which to make more keys. Rendell Locke's younger brother Duncan follows the group into the cave, but he is mesmerized by demons in the open door, and attempts to walk through it. He is stopped by Lucas "Dodge" Caravaggio, who accidentally puts his hand through the doorway and is possessed by a demonic being. He plots to kill his friends and enslave the others; Dodge kills several and causes another to lose her memory. He also extracts a part of his spirit to be hidden in a jar in the home of Ellen "Ellie" Whedon, one of the surviving friends, as a contingency plan. Dodge is finally killed by Rendell before he can force more people to be possessed. Rendell discovers a small piece of "whispering" iron from the sea cave and disguises it as a fishing lure.

Around 2010, the fragment of Dodge's spirit partially possesses Ellie, who then conjures the rest of Dodge's spirit in the physical world at the magical well at Keyhouse, but Dodge is trapped within the well house. In 2011, Dodge's spirit reaches out to a young, abused prodigy, Sam Lesser, and convinces him to force Rendell to give him the Anywhere Key (which will allow Dodge to escape the wellhouse) and the Omega Key. When Rendell refuses, Sam murders him, but Sam is then incapacitated by Tyler, Rendell's oldest son, and captured by the police. The Locke family, children Tyler, Kinsey, Bode, and mother Nina, move across the country to Keyhouse, reuniting with Duncan, and begin discovering the house's secrets. Sam escapes prison with Dodge's help and follows the Lockes to Massachusetts. Sam attacks the family again at Keyhouse, but Dodge also tricks Bode into bringing him the Anywhere Key in case Sam fails again. Dodge escapes from the wellhouse with Bode's help, kills Sam, and returns to Lovecraft in the same body as he had thirty years before.

Dodge intimidates his way into living in Ellie's home, who is now a teacher at the same high school she originally attended with Dodge, and where Tyler and Kinsey are enrolled; Dodge also re-enters the school under the guise of a new student and Ellie's cousin. Over the next year, Dodge secretly tries to recover the various keys – particularly the Omega Key – from the children, collecting many, though hindered by Tyler and Kinsey. Dodge is eventually discovered but manages to switch bodies and possesses Bode before they can kill him. Now free to explore the house as Bode, Dodge finally finds the Omega Key and plans his takeover during the after-prom party in the sea cave. Demons possess several students, and many others are killed. Dodge is ultimately undone by Tyler, having re-discovered the "whispering" iron from his father; he forges an "Alpha Key" with Duncan's help, which can exorcise a demon from the possessed soul, though it is fatal to the physical host. Dodge's spirit, in Bode's body, is forced back into the well killing the spirit again, though Bode's empty body is cremated before Bode's soul has a chance to return into it.

In the epilogue, Tyler conjures Dodge's spirit again and uses the Alpha Key to finally exorcise Dodge from Lucas' soul, allowing Lucas' unpossessed soul to finally rest in death. Tyler uses the well's magic to speak with his father one last time. Finally, Tyler restores Bode's spirit to his physical form using the Animal Key.

== Publication history ==
The narrative of Locke & Key has a three-act structure, with each act covering two story arcs. Act One's first story arc, Welcome to Lovecraft, was a six-issue limited series published by IDW Publishing. The first issue of Welcome to Lovecraft was released on February 20, 2008, and sold out in a single day, requiring a second printing to be done immediately. The second arc of Act One, Head Games, commenced with the release of the first issue on January 22, 2009. The actual Head Games story was printed in four issues, with a standalone prologue ("Intermission" or "The Joe Ridgeway Story") and a standalone conclusion ("Army of One").

The first storyline of Locke & Key Act Two, Crown of Shadows, began in late 2009. The second storyline, Keys to the Kingdom, began in August 2010.

The first storyline of Act Three was announced as Time & Tide, but was retitled Clockworks. The second, and concluding, storyline is entitled Alpha & Omega.

Originally, the plan was to release the first five-story arcs in a monthly format with the sixth arc published as an original graphic novel. The plan changed, and the concluding story arc appeared in monthly installments.

== Keys ==
In the universe of Locke & Key, there are many keys created from whispering iron that have different magical properties. Some of them are extensively featured in the series, while others are featured very briefly. The known keys are:

- Alpha Key: Created by Tyler Locke. Removes demons from possessed people's souls when inserted into their chests. It instantly turns a demon into whispering iron, so if the demon is still inside the host, the key's effect is fatal.
- Angel Key: Gives the user control of a winged harness that grants the ability to fly.
- Animal Key: Used on the right door in Keyhouse, it allows the user to travel through the door and transform into an animal. It is unclear whether they have a choice in the matter. It appears that the key assigns the animal according to some spiritual affinity. Returning through the door transforms a person back into a human. This works for human ghosts that have possessed animal bodies. Animals may also transform into humans if they enter through the opposite side of the door.
- Anywhere Key: Opens a door to anywhere the bearer can visualize in their mind. It is also capable of allowing Echos to leave the well house unharmed.
- Chain Key: A large chain, ball, and shackle-shaped key. Controls the Great Lock, which guards the catacombs with entangling chains.
- Creation Key: Resembling a pencil, this key causes anything drawn with it to become real, living, or otherwise. These things can also be erased by touching the other end of the key to them.
- Demon Key: When held against the spine of a person, a lock will appear. Upon being inserted, the victim becomes possessed by a demon.
- Echo Key: Allows entry to the Keyhouse wellhouse and, with the Echo Key in hand, allows a person to return a spirit from the dead to the world of the living. Leaving through the wellhouse door, however, banishes the spirit back to wherever it came from. This also applies to spirits that have possessed living bodies using the Ghost Key.
- Enigma Key: The purpose of this key seems to be intentionally unknown.
- Gender Key: Unlocks a half-sized door between rooms, which changes the sex of a person who enters it.
- Ghost Key: When used in the right door in Keyhouse, it separates the soul from the body of whoever travels through the door. The body falls dead while their ghost is free to roam the Keyhouse grounds. Ghost souls can inhabit any other bodies nearby and clash with other ghosts. If the door is closed while the user is a ghost, they will become permanently separated from their own body. If the user is possessed by a demon, the demon will become visible when the user is a ghost, appearing to be physically attached to their spine.
- Giant Key: This physically large wooden key, once inserted into a keyhole-shaped window in Keyhouse, transforms the bearer into a massive giant.
- Grindhouse Key: Transforms whatever door it opens into a giant fanged mouth that consumes whatever enters it.
- Harlequin Key: Unlocks the Harlequin Wardrobe and allows objects not normally inside to be seen.
- Head Key: Inserted into the base of someone's head, it allows one to peer inside the mind of a person, where memories and mental concepts (including "sanity" itself) are represented as tiny beings. The memories can be removed and swapped between people. Books inserted into a head with the Head Key transfer their contents to the bearer of the key, though in such a situation, the knowledge of the text is accurate but superficial.
- Hell Key: The bearer is automatically the Lord of Hell and can open the gates of Hell.
- Hercules Key: Embedded in a necklace, it grants the bearer considerable strength and bulk. The necklace was replaced by a belt in the Netflix series.
- Identity Key: Upon inserting into the base of one's chin, the bearer can change any aspect of their appearance, including clothes, body, or even gender. Also allows a bearer to forcibly change the appearance of others. However, the new appearance cannot match that of any existing person, and the user has to create a new face in their mind.
- IDW Key: Opens an outhouse in the woods bearing the eye of the IDW Comics logo. Once opened, the outhouse summons characters from other IDW comic books.
- Keyhouse Key: A large hammer-shaped key that fits into a stone slab and regenerates the Keyhouse after it is destroyed.
- Matchstick Key: Creates fires when inserted into a door or touched to an object, including a body. Shaped like a burning matchstick.
- Mending Key: Opens a magical cabinet in the Keyhouse into which a broken object can be placed (the cabinet can resize itself to the size of the object). Once the object is locked inside the cabinet, it is repaired. While it can heal severely wounded people to some extent, it apparently cannot resurrect the dead.
- Mirror Key: When inserted into a mirror, it allows the user to open a doorway to a parallel-pocket universe, called the Prison of the Self. This key affects a mirror's reflection if it is held toward a mirror, as it makes the reflection eerily pleasant and beckons the person to enter. The user is then enticed to come into the mirror by their reflection, and upon entering, they find themselves in a dark, empty abyss.
- Moon Key: Allows the user to reach and open the Moon like a door, which allows the user to pass on to the afterlife peacefully. Inhabitants who cross the door see the living world like a stage they can observe, and the afterlife like the backstage of a theater.
- Music Box Key: Inserted into a magical music box, it will cause the box to play a song that compels whoever is listening to obey its lyrics. Whoever turns the key can supply the commands. Commands are carried out so long as the music is playing and the listener can hear it.
- Omega Key: Opens the lock on the demonic door. The first key to be created.
- Orchestra Key: Inserted into a gramophone, this harp-shaped key will summon an orchestra composed of miniature humans.
- Owl Key: Gives the user control of a mechanical owl.
- Philosophoscope Key: Gives access to a device that allows viewing of various people and places, including concepts such as the user's truest love, greatest enemy, and future place of death.
- Reali Key: Allows passage to alternate dimensions.
- Shadow Key: Allows its wearer to control shadow creatures, and even the shadows of other people. Shadows are capable of interacting with the material world (often violently) but can be rendered immaterial by bright light. Embedded in a crown, the key is a tremendous source of power for the wearer.
- Skin Key: A key with a gazing mirror on its handle, it can change the ethnicity of whoever is using it.
- Small World Key: Unlocks a dollhouse replica of Keyhouse, allowing the user to see anything in Keyhouse in real-time. Any interaction with the unlocked dollhouse also occurs within the actual house, such as a house spider entering the dollhouse, magically emerging as a giant spider within the real house.
- Snow Globe Key: Traps the user inside a snowglobe resembling Keyhouse.
- Splody Key: Resembling a cartoonish stick of dynamite, this key causes explosions in any building it is used within.
- Squirrel/Undertree Key: Controls squirrels.
- Stamp Key: Allows the bearer to send postage through alternate dimensions and timelines.
- Sword Key: When inserted into the handle of any sword, it allows the sword to cut through any object.
- Tempus Fugit Key: Can turn the bearer into an older version of themselves, possibly other ages.
- Timeshift Key: Operates a grandfather clock that allows a user to observe (but not interact with) past events. The clock is limited to a specific time period: the earliest date one can visit is January 13, 1775, and the latest is December 31, 1999.
- Teddy Bear Key: Animates and controls stuffed teddy bears.
- Thorn Key: Controls plants, including for offensive purposes. This Key was redesigned and renamed the Plant Key for the Netflix series.
- Unnamed Riffel Key (unofficial name): A key created by Hans Riffel, the last person to use whispering iron before Tyler. The key is to the front door of Keyhouse Manor and implements the Riffel Rule, where no one who enters the front door of the house as an adult can directly see the power of the keys. People who age into adulthood will also begin to lose their conscious memories of the keys and their magic. Shown in the Netflix Series as the Memory Key, resembling a third eye with a keyhole for a pupil. The Memory Key also bestows the user with the ability to remember magic in adulthood if inserted into their clavicle.
- 2" Key: Shrinks the bearer down to two inches tall.

=== Keys with unknown purposes ===
These keys have not made an appearance in the official comics but appear in merchandise, promotional tie-ins, and/or non-canon materials. They may have also appeared in concept art. Regardless, their purpose or abilities are unknown.

- Ankh Key
- Audible Key
- Biblio Key
- Compass Key
- Freemason Key
- Illuminati Key
- Jetpack Key
- Phoenix Key
- Scepter Key
- Snow Angel Key
- Toy Key
- Trident Key
- Yin-Yang Key

=== Locks that hint at potential keys ===
These are locks that are seen in the art that could hint at the existence of potential Keys. Names are not official.

- Cat Key: (Lock seen in Small World). A lock can be seen on the collar worn by Jean and Mary Locke's pet cat, Tiberius.
- Gauntlet Key: (Lock seen in Keys To The Kingdom #3) A gauntlet with a lock on it can be seen in the Harlequin Wardrobe when it is first opened by Bode.
- Keys to Omega Doors #1-#10: (Locks seen in Crown of Shadow #2: "In the Cave" & Clockworks #4: "The Whispering Iron"). While exploring the Drowning Caves, Kinsey Locke and her friends encounter an Omega Door marked with a #1 that they cannot open. This is shown to be a door separate from the Black Door, as the Black Door is deeper in the caves and is marked with a #11. This door reappears in a flashback to Rendell Locke and the Tamers of the Tempest on their way to the Black Door. Omega Doors marked with a #5 and #3 are also seen. This implies that there are at least 10 Omega Doors (not counting #11) in the caves, which may have their own Keys. It is unknown if the Omega Key has anything to do with these doors.
- Penny-farthing Key: (Lock seen in Golden Age 9: "Hell & Gone #2"). One of the items in the Harlequin Wardrobe in 1927 was a Penny-farthing bicycle with Keys as its wheel spokes and a lock on its handle.
- Radio Key: (Lock seen in Dog Days). A keyhole shape can be seen on the old-fashioned radio that the two sons of Mary Locke listen to with their dog.
- Stained Glass Key: (Lock seen in Omega 2). Assuming the keyhole on the Glass Ceiling is an actual keyhole and not just an image. Much like how the keyhole for the Giant Key was also a glass window.

=== Keys to the Classics ===
These keys were designed as merchandise and are based on several famous novels and fairy tales. They were created as a limited series by Skelton Crew. Skelton Crew is solely responsible for making all purchasable replicas of Locke & Key keys. These specific keys do not appear in the comics or the Netflix Series.

- Key to Ahab's Quarters: Based on the book Moby Dick by Herman Melville.
- Key to Atlantis: Based on the story Timaeus by Plato.
- Key to the Brick House: Based on the short story The Three Little Pigs by Joseph Jacob.
- Key to Castle Frankenstein: Based on the novel Frankenstein; or, The Modern Prometheus by Mary Shelley.
- Key to the Churchyard: Based on the story The Legend of Sleepy Hollow by Washington Irving.
- Key to Dracula's Castle: Based on the book Dracula by Bram Stoker.
- Key to the Falcon's Nest: Based on the novel The Swiss Family Robinson by Johann David Wyss.
- Key to Geppetto's Workshop: Based on the novel The Adventures of Pinocchio by Carlo Collodi.
- Key to the Giant's Castle: Based on the fairy tail Jack and the Beanstalk by Benjamin Tabart.
- Key to the Glass Coffin: Based on the fairy tale Snow White by The Brothers Grimm.
- Key to the House of Pain: Based on the book The Island of Doctor Moreau by H.G. Wells.
- Key to the Hundred Acre Wood: Based on the book series Winnie The Pooh by A.A. Milne.
- Key to the Ice Palace: Based on the short story The Snow Queen by Hans Christian Andersen.
- Key to Dr. Jekyll's Laboratory: Based on the book Strange Case of Dr. Jekyll and Mr. Hyde by Robert Louis Stevenson.
- Key to the Labyrinth: Based on the book Life of Theseus by Plutarch.
- Key to the Looking Glass: Based on the book Through The Looking Glass by Lewis Carroll.
- Key to Marley's Chains: Based on the story A Christmas Carol by Charles Dickens.
- Key to the Nautilus: Based on the novel Twenty Thousand Leagues Under the Seas by Jules Verne.
- Key to Neverland: Based on the novel Peter Pan and Wendy by J.M. Barrie.
- Key to Oz: Based on the novel The Wonderful Wizard of Oz by L. Frank Baum.
- Key to the Ruined City: Based on the book The Jungle Book by Ruyard Kipling.
- Key to R'Lyeh: Based on the short story The Call of Cthulhu by H.P. Lovecraft.
- Key to the Sea King's Castle: Based on the story The Little Mermaid by Hans Christian Andersen.
- Key to Sherwood Forest: Based on the story The Merry Adventures of Robin Hood by Howard Pyle.
- Key to Skull Island: Based on the book King Kong by Delos W. Lovelace.
- Key to Slumberland: Based on the novel Little Nemo in Slumberland by Winsor McCay.
- Key to the Steamboat: Based on the cartoon short Steamboat Willie by Ub Iwerks.
- Key to St. Nick's Workshop: Based on the short story Twas the Night Before Christmas by Clement C. Moore.
- Key to Tik Tok: Based on the book Ozma of Oz by L. Frank Baum.
- Key to the Witches House: Based on the story Hansel and Gretel by The Brothers Grimm.
- Key to Wonderland: Based on the novel Alice's Adventures In Wonderland by Lewis Carroll.
- Key to Toad Hall: Based on the novel The Wind in the Willows by Kenneth Grahame.
- Key to the Tripod: Based on the book The War Of The Worlds by H.G. Wells.
- Key to 221B Baker Street: Based on the novel A Study in Scarlet by Arthur Conan Doyle.

== Story arcs ==
=== Locke & Key ===
==== Welcome to Lovecraft ====
Issue	Release	Summary
#1	February 20, 2008	After the murder of their father, Tyler, Kinsey, and Bode Locke relocate with their mother to the family estate of Keyhouse, located in Lovecraft, Massachusetts. Sam Lesser, one of the teens who murdered Mr. Locke, is in a juvenile detention center and, by gazing in water, communicates with a supernatural force that promises to free him. Bode Locke, the youngest of the family, uncovers The Ghost Door, which separates his spirit from his body.
#2	March 26, 2008	Bode continues to experiment with The Ghost Door and, in his incorporeal form, spies on his brother, sister, and mother. During his journeys, Bode discovers a well that houses a creature who appears as a girl, the supernatural force previously communicating with Sam Lesser.
#3	April 30, 2008	Sam Lesser uses the tools the girl gave him to escape from the detention center.
#4	May 28, 2008	Sam Lesser travels across America, making his way towards Keyhouse. His cross-country journey is mirrored by a series of flashbacks into his memories.
#5	June 25, 2008	The Locke family is taken hostage by Sam Lesser, who is seeking the Anywhere Key for his Master, the girl in the well.
#6	July 30, 2008	Bode uncovers the Anywhere Key and trades it with the girl in the well for a promise that she'll stop Sam Lesser. Freed from her prison, she keeps her promise by throwing Sam through the Ghost Door with no chance to return.

==== Head Games ====
Issue	Release	Chapter Title	Summary
#1	January 28, 2009	Intermission	Professor Joe Ridgeway recognizes Zack Wells as Lucas Caravaggio, a teenager who disappeared over twenty years before, along with several other students, and who has long been presumed dead. Joe soon sets out to dig up the truth on Wells, but Zack proves ruthless in his desire for secrecy.
#2	February 25, 2009	Chapter One	A shocking death throws Kinsey and Tyler Locke into choppy emotional waters. They turn to Zack Wells for support, not knowing him to be the murderer. Meanwhile, six-year-old Bode Locke tries to puzzle out the secret of the head key, and Uncle Duncan is jarred into the past by a disturbingly familiar face.
#3	March 4, 2009	Chapter Two	Kinsey, Tyler, and Bode discover the head key allows them to open up people's minds and play with their memories.
#4	April 8, 2009	Chapter Three	Duncan Locke finds himself faced with a dizzying, impossible revelation; Tyler makes the ill-considered decision to share with others the unlikely powers of the head key; and Kinsey opts to remove troubling emotions from her mind.
#5	May 20, 2009	Chapter Four	Dodge uses the head key on Duncan Locke, sparing his life but inadvertently leading to the injury of Locke's live-in boyfriend.
#6	July 1, 2009	Army of One	We learn how Dodge maintains control of Ellie even without the use of a head key in a flashback sequence.

==== Crown of Shadows ====
Issue	Release	Chapter Title	Summary
#1	November 11, 2009	The Haunting of Keyhouse	Sam Lesser may be dead and gone, but Dodge still has uses for him, and in the first chill days of October, will make contact with him again. The dead know things the living may not, and Sam's restless spirit has had time to discover the thing Dodge wants to know most of all... where to find the key to the black door.
#2	December 16, 2009	In the Cave	Far below Keyhouse lies the Drowning Cave, a place where shadows obscure ancient secrets, and the stones are stained with ancient blood. Kinsey Locke descends into the cavern, looking for answers to her family's troubled past, only to discover that it's easier to get in than it is to get out...
#3	February 17, 2010	Last Light	Dodge takes possession of the crown of shadows, and darkness falls upon Keyhouse... with a vengeance.
#4	March 17, 2010	Shadow Play	Kinsey and Bode find themselves in a desperate, seemingly unwinnable battle against a rising army of living shadows, while Tyler faces down Dodge in a terrifying duel of wits and wills.
#5	April 28, 2010	Light of Day	The owners of the Giant Key and the Shadow Key go head to head.
#6	July 14, 2010	Beyond Repair	In a terrible night of grief and rage, Nina Locke discovers a new key, one which opens a cabinet capable of mending smashed objects; but some things, she will learn, are beyond repair...

==== Keys to the Kingdom ====
Issue	Release	Chapter Title	Summary
#1	August 11, 2010	Sparrow	As the new arc begins, Bode Locke discovers a key that unlocks the world of tooth, fang, claw, and feather, in a story that leaves hundreds dead! Hundreds of birds, that is.
#2	October 20, 2010	White	On a bitter winter day, Kinsey Locke encounters a madwoman who just might be able to unlock the darkest secrets of Keyhouse. But forcing the truth out of her won't be easy, and besides... Dodge has no intention of ever giving Erin Voss a chance to tell what she knows.
#3	November 24, 2010	February	Dodge and the Locke children do battle via their keys over 29 days. The cover image shows a February 2012 calendar page (the final 2 in 2012 is obscured by a bloody hand print, but only 2012 fits, being a leap year February beginning on a Wednesday).
#4	January 26, 2011	Casualties	When Squadron Strange accept a mission from a ghost, they find themselves on their most perilous raid ever... straight into the heart of a haunted mansion. Sgt. Rufus Whedon and Corporal Bode Locke have a terrifying lesson to learn: if you're dealing with a dead man, you'd better think fast and fight hard, if you don't want to wind up one yourself.
#5	March 2, 2011	Detectives, Part 1	Tyler Locke begins, finally, to consider what he knows about the terrifying but mysterious enemy that has harrowed the Locke family for months—only to find that all the evidence points to a single suspect: Zack Wells.
#6	April 27, 2011	Detectives, Part 2	'Keys to the Kingdom' comes to a close as Dodge and Tyler Locke confront one another at last. Tyler came armed with the truth; Dodge prefers sharper instruments and shows his willingness to use them.

==== Clockworks ====
Issue	Release	Chapter Title	Summary
#1	July 20, 2011	The Locksmith's Son	Colonel Adam Crais's minutemen are literally trapped between a rock and a hard place; in the first days of the Revolutionary War, they find themselves hiding beneath 120 feet of New England stone, with a full regiment of redcoats waiting for them in the daylight... and a door into hell in the cavern below. The black door is open, and it's up to a 16-year-old smith named Ben Locke to find a way to close it. The biggest mysteries of the Locke & Key series are resolved as Clockworks opens, not with a bang, but with the thunderous crash of English cannons.
#2	August 31, 2011	SMASH!	Terror runs wild, and the Locke family comes to grief in the smash-ingest story of the series yet!
#3	December 14, 2011	The Tamers of the Tempest	The Omega Key to The Black Door has been found by Dodge, still in Bode's body.
#4	February 1, 2012	The Whispering Iron	The tamers of The Tempest—Rendell Locke, Dodge Caravaggio, and their friends—descend into the Drowning Cave to open the Black Door, hoping to get their hands on some of the fabled whispering iron, the material from which all of the keys are forged. And everything goes according to plan! Not.
#5	March 14, 2012	Grown-Ups	Lucas "Dodge" Caravaggio returns from the Drowning Cave, infected by a parasite of the soul; the good and loving friend has been left behind, and replaced by something free of all human feeling. Searching for a way to control him, the Keepers of the Keys make a dreadful choice... and set off a chain of events that will end in an unimaginable slaughter.
#6	May 16, 2012	Curtain	As a storm thunders up the coast to Lovecraft, Massachusetts, the Keepers of the Keys face Dodge a final time, under three hundred feet of stone, in the darkness before the Black Door. Here, water will mix with blood, and The Drowning Cave will become a colossal grave, in the final issue of the CLOCKWORKS storyline.

==== Alpha & Omega ====
The final arc is titled Locke & Key: Alpha & Omega; it collects Omega #1–5 and Alpha #1–2.

Issue	Release	Chapter Title	Summary
Omega #1	November 14, 2012	Our Regrets	The beginning of the end starts here. Dodge has the Omega key, and nothing can stop him from using it...
Omega #2	December 19, 2012	The Soldier	A ghost haunts the long halls of Keyhouse—the spirit of Bode Locke, cast out of his body by the Demon named Dodge—and only one person can hear his voice: Bode's old playmate, Rufus Whedon.
Omega #3	February 20, 2013	Last Dance	As Kinsey Locke and the other students head to a dance at Lovecraft Academy, the demonic Dodge gathers shadowy forces of his own and enacts his evil endgame. The "Last Dance" begins here.
Omega #4	April 3, 2013	Human Sacrifices	The bottomless pit of the Drowning Cave threatens to become a mass grave, as Dodge springs a fatal trap on the senior class of Lovecraft Academy. Hope is as fragile as a candle-flame wavering in the night... and as easy to extinguish.
Omega #5	June 5, 2013	The Fall	In the Drowning Cave, the black door is open at last, and for the kids trapped down there, the choice is simple: resist and die, or pass through the door and be lost forever. In the hole beneath Keyhouse, the stones run with blood, the living shadows run riot, and time runs out... as Locke & Key enters its final chapters.
Alpha #1	September 11, 2013	Alpha	In the penultimate issue of Locke & Key, the damned and the saved alike will make their final stand in the Drowning Cave, in a clash of blood and fire. The shadows have never been darker, and the end has never been closer. Turn the key and open the last door; it's time to say goodbye.
Alpha #2	December 18, 2013	The Last Door	"The End." A door claps softly shut. A key scrapes in a last rusted lock. It ends here: the story of the Locke children and their desperate, tragic battle with the monster set on destroying them... the past.

=== World War Key ===
At the 2019 San Diego Comic-Con, Joe Hill confirmed that a new Locke & Key series called World War Key was in the works. This storyline as Hill puts it is "about the idea that the past is never gone... and I think a lot of ghost stories are about ways the past keep bleeding through to the present. We'll visit the Revolutionary War, Civil War, and World War II to show how those past events have had lingering effects on our heroes today." As of 2019, the series is expected to run thirty-seven issues across six books (not including The Golden Age). World War Key is designed to be both a prequel and a sequel to the original run of Locke & Key.

==== The Golden Age ====
A series of short stories set in the past. In his newsletter, Joe Hill referred to the book as "World War Key 0: The Golden Age".

Locke & Key: …In Pale Battalions Go… will be a three-issue story that leads into World War Key, set at the beginning of the 20th century and will feature characters from "Small World" and "Open the Moon". It will also lead into the Locke & Key/Sandman Universe crossover comic. On February 21, 2020, IDW announced via their Twitter that Locke & Key would be crossing over with DC Comics's Sandman Universe. The story, Hell & Gone, will center around DC's Key to Hell from The Sandman: Season of Mists. Hell & Gone will wrap up The Golden Age arc.

According to Joe Hill, ...In Pale Battalions Go... was originally supposed to be just two issues, but he quickly realized that it wasn't enough to tell the full story, so it was increased to three.

Issue	Release	Summary
Guide to the Known Keys	November 23, 2011	This special standalone issue features an expanded "Guide to the Known Keys", an all-new "Guide to Failed Keys", and a story of summer night magic titled "Open the Moon", set in Keyhouse's unlikely past.
Small World	December 21, 2016	An impossible birthday gift for two little girls unexpectedly throws open a door to a monster on eight legs. Joe Hill has said that the title is a shout out to the horror novel of the same name by his mother Tabitha King.
...In Pale Battalions Go... #1	August 26, 2020	"The impossible, reality-bending keys of Keyhouse have always been weapons of war. In the spring of 1915, Chamberlin Locke's oldest son, John, is desperate to be a part of the greatest war of all… and never mind that he's too young to enlist. He means to use the power of the keys to turn the tide, and will tell any lie, and try any manipulation, to have his way. Prepare to open a door onto one of the grimmest battlefields of the 20th century, whose darkness might even strike fear into an army of supernatural shadows."
...In Pale Battalions Go... #2	October 7, 2020	"The impossible, reality-bending keys of Keyhouse have always been weapons of war. In the spring of 1915, Chamberlin Locke's oldest son, John, is desperate to be a part of the greatest war of all… and never mind that he's too young to enlist. He means to use the power of the keys to turn the tide, and will tell any lie, and try any manipulation, to have his way. Prepare to open a door onto one of the grimmest battlefields of the 20th century, whose darkness might even strike fear into an army of supernatural shadows."
...In Pale Battalions Go... #3	December 16, 2020	"Jonathan Locke uses the power of the Anywhere Key to flee the slaughter in Ypres and return to Keyhouse. But now the door is open between Flanders Fields and Lovecraft, Massachusetts… and the sinister Oberleutnant Eric Murnau has led a small band through to claim the magical keys for Germany!"
Hell & Gone #0	December 9, 2020	This issue recollects "Guide to the Known Keys" and "Open the Moon" with an excerpt from Sandman #1.
Hell & Gone #1	April 14, 2021	"If you think you can unlock the gates of Hell and just invite yourself in, you must be Dreaming! The epic crossover between two of the most beloved fantasy universes in comics begins here. John "Jack" Locke is ten years dead, but that hasn't stopped him from posting the occasional letter home... from Hell. Now Mary Locke will do anything to save her brother's soul, including cut a deal with Roderick Burgess-the most evil man in England-to search for answers in the House of Mystery and risk the walking nightmare known as the Corinthian to find help in a disintegrating Kingdom of Dreams!"
Hell & Gone #2	September 28, 2021	"To win back her brother's soul from Hell, Mary Locke has done the unthinkable—she's seized control of the imprisoned Dream Lord's artifacts of power and crossed over into his place of power, the Dreaming! Unfortunately, she's managed to find herself in the middle of a war for the future of the kingdom, led by none other than the monstrous Corinthian. And even if Mary survives her encounter, the road to Hell ends in locked gates guarded by Etrigan the Demon and the all-powerful Lucifer himself! Of course, the Locke family has always had a knack for making keys…"
Face the Music	April 26, 2022	TBD

Joe Hill has stated that the chronological order of the Golden Age chapters is as follows:

1. Small World
2. Open the Moon
3. Face the Music
4. ...In Pale Battalions Go...#1
5. ...In Pale Battalions Go...#2
6. ...In Pale Battalions Go...#3
7. Hell & Gone #1
8. Hell & Gone #2

==== Revolution ====
The first arc of World War Key. Joe Hill stated in an interview that Revolution "takes place during the Revolutionary War and it's about how the magical keys won the Revolutionary War."

==== Resurrection ====
The second arc of World War Key, according to Joe Hill. He described the plot: "leaps forward to the modern-day, [where] we visit some favorite characters from the Locke & Key series, and we see how they're doing. And we all see the events of the Revolutionary War staining through into the present."

Issue	Release	Chapter Title	Summary
#1	TBD	TBD	TBD

=== Standalone issues ===
Many fans believed that "GRINDHOUSE" and "DOG DAYS" were a part of the Golden Age arc until Joe Hill stated via Twitter that they are at the moment their own standalone stories that are not a part of any arc.

Issue	Release	Summary
IDW: 10 Year Anniversary Comic Book	January 1, 2009	"In the Can" A rare Locke & Key short that was published for the first time in IDW: 10 Year Anniversary Comic Book. While searching for keys near Keyhouse, Bode feels nature's call and stumbles upon a mysterious outhouse with the IDW Key.
Locke & Key: Grindhouse	August 29, 2012	Set in the glare of a Depression-era summer, in which three Canuck gangsters carry out a heist and hide out at the Keyhouse. The issue includes an expanded "Guide to Keyhouse" describing the mansion.
Locke & Key: Nailed It	July 19, 2019	"Nailed It" A 2019 San Diego Comic-Con exclusive featuring behind-the-scenes material. "Some doors, once closed, can never be opened again. While others shouldn't be reopened ever again…" This short story involves Tyler regenerating Keyhouse using the Keyhouse Key after it was destroyed.
Locke & Key: Dog Days	November 6, 2019	"Dog Days" Two boys of the Locke family use the Animal Key to turn their pet dog into a human boy. This story originally appeared in a 48-page special, which also recollected "Nailed It", along with behind-the-scenes material.

== Collected editions ==
=== Standard editions ===
Volume	Release	Title	Summary	ISBN
1	October 8, 2008	Locke & Key: Welcome to Lovecraft	Collects Welcome to Lovecraft #1–6	9781600102370 (Hardcover); 9781600103841 (Paperback)
2	September 30, 2009	Locke & Key: Head Games	Collects Head Games #1–6	9781600104831 (Hardcover); 9781600107610 (Paperback)
3	July 29, 2010	Locke & Key: Crown of Shadows	Collects Crown of Shadows #1–6	9781600106958 (Hardcover); 9781600109539 (Paperback)
4	July 19, 2011	Locke & Key: Keys to the Kingdom	Collects Keys to the Kingdom #1–6	9781600108860 (Hardcover); 9781613772072 (Paperback)
5	July 24, 2012	Locke & Key: Clockworks	Collects Clockworks #1–6	9781613772270 (Hardcover); 9781613776995 (Paperback)
6	February 4, 2014	Locke & Key: Alpha & Omega	Collects Alpha #1–2 and Omega #1–5	9781613778531 (Hardcover); 9781631401442 (Paperback)
—	January 4, 2017	Locke & Key: Small World	Collects The Golden Age stand-alone issue Small World.	9781631408465 (Hardcover)
—	August 15, 2017	Locke & Key: Heaven and Earth	Collects The Golden Age stand-alone short stories "Open the Moon", Grindhouse, and "In the Can", (a rare Locke and Key short that was published in IDW: 10 Year Anniversary Comic Book in 2009)	9781684051816 (Hardcover)
7	April 26, 2022	Locke & Key: The Golden Age	Collects Small World, "Open the Moon", …In Pale Battalions Go… #1–3, "Face the Music", and Hell & Gone #1–2	9781684057856 (Hardcover)

On November 11, 2014, the first six volumes were collected as a slipcase set of paperbacks.

=== Master editions ===
Locke & Key was also collected in three hardcover books with all-new cover art and design by Gabriel Rodriguez.

- Locke & Key Master Edition Volume 1 (May 19, 2015). Collects the first two arcs, Welcome to Lovecraft and Head Games.
- Locke & Key Master Edition Volume 2 (March 22, 2016). Collects the third and fourth arcs, Crown of Shadows and Keys to the Kingdom.
- Locke & Key Master Edition Volume 3 (October 18, 2016). Collects the fifth and sixth arcs, Clockworks and Alpha & Omega.

=== Keyhouse Compendium Edition ===
All six arcs (Welcome to Lovecraft, Head Games, Crown of Shadows, Keys to the Kingdom, Clockworks, and Alpha & Omega) of the main story are published in one compendium edition, featuring new front and back cover art by Gabriel Rodriguez. The compendium had an original release date of October 2020, but it was delayed and eventually published July 20, 2021.

=== Signed limited editions ===
On November 11, 2007, Subterranean Press announced a pre-order for a hand-numbered, signed, limited edition of the six-issue run of Welcome To Lovecraft. This edition consisted of 250 numbered copies and 26 lettered copies, both of which sold out within 24 hours of being announced. This edition was a hardcover release in a specially designed and illustrated slipcase, and featured exclusive dust jacket art by Vincent Chong and reprinted all 250 pages of Joe Hill's script in addition to the actual comic work.

This was followed by the publication of Head Games, which was also limited to 250 hand-numbered and signed copies as well as 26 lettered copies. The third volume, Crown of Shadows, is available for preorder, and like the previous editions is signed and numbered with the same limitations and also comes with an illustrated slipcase. Cloth-bound trade editions limited to 1000 copies (unsigned, unnumbered, and without the slipcase) were also released. Trade editions for the first two volumes are sold out.

== Awards and nominations ==
Comic Book/Graphic Novel

Year	Award	Category	Notes	Result	Ref.
2009	Eisner Award	Best Limited Series		Nominated	
2009	Eisner Award	Best Writer	Joe Hill	Nominated	
2010	British Fantasy Award	Best Comic or Graphic Novel		Nominated	
2011	Eisner Award	Best Writer	Joe Hill	Won	
2011	Eisner Award	Best Single Issue	Locke & Key: Keys to the Kingdom #1: "Sparrow"	Nominated	
2011	Eisner Award	Best Continuing Series		Nominated	
2011	Eisner Award	Best Penciller	Gabriel Rodriguez	Nominated	
2011	Scream Awards	Best Comic Book or Graphic Novel		Nominated	
2011	Scream Awards	Best Comic Book Writer	Joe Hill ("The Cape" also credited)	Nominated	
2012	British Fantasy Award	Best Graphic Novel	Locke & Key: Keys to the Kingdom	Won	
2012	Bram Stoker Award	Best Graphic Novel	Locke & Key: Keys to the Kingdom	Nominated	
2012	Hugo Award	Best Graphic Story	Locke & Key: Keys to the Kingdom	Nominated	
2013	Hugo Award	Best Graphic Story	Locke & Key: Clockworks	Nominated	
2015	Bram Stoker Award	Best Graphic Novel	Locke & Key: Alpha and Omega	Nominated	
2015	Mythopoeic Fantasy Award	Best Adult Literature		Nominated	
2016	Ghastly Award	Best One-Shot Comic	Locke & Key: Golden Age #1: "Small World"	Won	
2016	Audie Award	Excellence in Marketing	Locke & Key Audio Book. Narrated by Haley Joel Osment, Tatiana Maslany, Kate Mulgrew, and a full cast (Audible Studios).	Won	
2022	Eisner Award	Best Graphic Album - Reprint	Locke & Key Keyhouse Compendium Edition Volume	Pending	

Netflix Adaptation

Awards and Nominations received by the Netflix series

== Adaptations ==
=== Film ===
A film trilogy was officially announced at the 2014 Comic-Con. Alex Kurtzman, Roberto Orci, Bobby Cohen and Ted Adams would produce the film with Universal Pictures and Kurtzman and Orci's production company K/O Paper Products.

In October 2015, Joe Hill confirmed that the films are no longer happening, though a TV series was still possible. In May 2016, Joe Hill announced he would write a TV pilot, serve as executive producer and pitch the show to various networks and streaming companies.

=== Television ===
==== Fox pilot (2010–2011) ====
Dimension Films acquired the film and television rights for Welcome to Lovecraft from IDW Publishing with the intent of developing the property as a feature with John Davis producing. In February 2010, it was announced that Dimension had lost the adaptation rights to DreamWorks with Alex Kurtzman and Roberto Orci signed on to develop and produce the project. In August 2010, Steven Spielberg also joined as a producer, and the production became a TV series rather than a movie adaptation, with Josh Friedman writing episodes for the show and acting as show-runner.

The TV series adaptation then landed at 20th Century Fox Television. The network greenlit a pilot, produced by DreamWorks TV and K/O Paper Products through the latter's deal with 20th Century Fox TV.

Miranda Otto played Nina Locke, Sarah Bolger was Kinsey Locke and Nick Stahl co-starred as Duncan Locke. Skylar Gaertner played 6-year old Bode, and Harrison Thomas played a teenager possessed by an evil spirit. Actor and singer Jesse McCartney appeared as Ty Locke, the series' male lead and Ksenia Solo was cast as Dodge.

Mark Romanek directed the pilot episode, which was filmed at the mansion in Hartwood Acres and in Ellwood City, Pennsylvania, in February 2011. The pilot was also shot throughout Pittsburgh that same month. In May 2011, Fox announced that the project would not be picked up as a series. The studio attempted to sell the project to other networks but eventually ceased efforts due to rising costs. The pilot was screened at the 2011 San Diego Comic-Con, where it was well received.

==== Hulu pilot (2017–2018) ====
On April 20, 2017, Hulu ordered a pilot based on the comic with Carlton Cuse, Scott Derrickson, and Lindsey Springer as producers. In July 2017, Derrickson was replaced by Andy Muschietti as the pilot's director. In August 2017, Frances O'Connor was cast as Nina in the show. In a March 2018 interview, Samantha Mathis revealed that Hulu had passed on the show, and it was now being shopped around to other networks.

==== Netflix series (2020–2022) ====
On May 30, 2018, after Hulu had passed on Locke & Key, it was announced that Netflix was nearing a series order for a re-developed version of the show with Cuse and Hill involved once again, and Muschietti as executive producer. The show found a new director for the pilot and an entirely new cast except for Jackson Robert Scott as Bode Locke, who was cast in the Hulu pilot as well.

Season one of the show, with 10 episodes, debuted on Netflix on February 7, 2020. Season two of the show, with 10 episodes, debuted on Netflix on October 22, 2021. The third and final season of the show, with 8 episodes, debuted on Netflix on August 10, 2022.

=== Audio drama ===
All six books of Locke & Key were adapted as a 13-hour audio drama released on 5 October 2015. Produced by the AudioComics Company for Audible Studios and directed by William Dufris, the work features voice actors including Tatiana Maslany, Haley Joel Osment, Kate Mulgrew, and Brennan Lee Mulligan, with appearances by series creators Rodríguez and Hill, as well as Hill's father Stephen King, in addition to almost 50 voice-over actors and an original score by Peter Van Riet. The work received critical praise and in 2016 was nominated for four Audie Awards from the Audiobook Publishers Association of America, including "Best Original Work" and "Excellence in Production."

=== Card game ===
In 2012, Cryptozoic Entertainment released a card game based on the series.

=== Webtoon ===
In 2025, the series was reformatted as a webcomic on Webtoon.

== See also ==
- The Lost Room – Prior work from 2006 with a very similar main concept to Locke & Key, a set of magical objects with different properties, including a key that opens any door to anywhere.

== Sources ==
- Locke & Key: Welcome to Lovecraft at the Grand Comics Database
- Locke & Key: Welcome to Lovecraft at the Comic Book DB (archived from the original)
- Locke & Key: Head Games at the Grand Comics Database
- Locke & Key: Head Games at the Comic Book DB (archived from the original)
- Locke & Key: Crown of Shadows at the Grand Comics Database
- Locke & Key: Crown of Shadows at the Comic Book DB (archived from the original)
- Locke & Key: Keys to the Kingdom at the Grand Comics Database
- Locke & Key: Keys to the Kingdom at the Comic Book DB (archived from the original)
