= List of zombie novels =

This is a list of zombie related novels that are notable, or written by notable authors.

== Novels and anthologies ==
Name	Author	Year	Description
Autumn: Aftermath	Moody, David	2012	The final book in the Autumn series
Autumn: The City	Moody, David	2003	The second novel in the Autumn series begins by introducing new characters whose actions run concurrent with the action in the original novel, before uniting the two groups.
Autumn: Disintegration	Moody, David	2011	A continuation of the Autumn series
Autumn: The Human Condition	Moody, David	2005	A continuation of the Autumn series
Autumn: Purification	Moody, David	2004	The third novel in the Autumn series revolves around a military bunker sealed off from the outside world.
The Awakening	McBean, Brett	2012	A coming-of-age novel concerning a teenager's tumultuous summer as he deals with the joys and hardships of growing up, while learning about the value of freedom at the hands of a kind but cursed old man. Contains strong elements of traditional Haitian Vodou and zombies.
Blackout	Grant, Mira	2011	Third novel in the Newsflesh series, following Deadline.
Bone Song	Meaney, John	2008	In a world populated by humans along with zombies, ghosts and other mystical creatures, a human police officer falls in love with his superior, a beautiful zombie woman.
The Book of All Flesh	Lowder, James (Editor)	2001	Anthology of stories including works by Tobias S. Buckell, Scott Edelman, Ed Greenwood, and Jim C. Hines.
Book of the Dead	Skipp, John and Spector, Craig (Editors)	1989	Anthology of stories including works by Stephen King, Ramsey Campbell, and Joe R. Lansdale.
The Book of Final Flesh	Lowder, James (Editor)	2003	Origins Award-winning anthology including works by Kealan Patrick Burke, Joseph Nassise, Paul G. Tremblay, and Tim Waggoner.
The Book of More Flesh	Lowder, James (Editor)	2002	Anthology including stories by Jesse Bullington, Charles Coleman Finlay, Claude Lalumière, and Thomas Piccirilli.
The Boy on the Bridge	Carey, M.R.	2017	A prequel to The Girl with All the Gifts.
Breathers: A Zombie's Lament	Browne, S. G.	2009	A dark, comedic take on zombies told from the point of view of a recently reanimated corpse.
Cell	King, Stephen	2006	Anyone talking on a cell phone after a particular event becomes an aggressive, bloodthirsty zombie.
City of the Dead	Keene, Brian	2005	This is the official follow-up to The Rising. Demons possess the bodies of the dead, including animals. One man attempts to reach his son.
Conan the Defiant	Perry, Steve	1987	One of Conan's companions, Tuanne, is a beautiful zombie; he is romantically interested in her.
The Dead	Higson, Charlie	2010	A young adult novel. Adults over sixteen turn to zombies and young survivors battle against them.
Dead City	McKinney, Joe	2006	Battered by five cataclysmic hurricanes in three weeks, the Texas Gulf Coast and half of the Lone Star state is reeling from the worst devastation in history. A deadly virus has broken out, returning the dead to life.
Dead of Night	Maberry, Jonathan	2011	A prison doctor injects a condemned serial killer with a formula designed to keep his consciousness awake while his body rots in the grave. But all drugs have unforeseen side-effects. Before he could be buried, the killer wakes up. Hungry. Infected. Contagious. This is the way the world ends. Not with a bang...but a bite.
Dead North: The Exile Book of Canadian Zombie Fiction	Moreno-Garcia, Silvia (Editor)	2007	Collection of twenty short stories from various authors, including Gemma Files, Claude Lalumière, Simon Strantzas, and Richard Van Camp.
Dead Sea	Keene, Brian	2007	A zombie apocalypse starts with undead rats emerging from Baltimore's sewers.
Deadline	Grant, Mira	2011	Second novel in the Newsflesh series, following Feed and followed by Blackout.
Death Troopers	Schreiber, Joe	2009	A story in the Star Wars universe about an Imperial prison ship stranded in space, encountering another ship crammed with the ship's crew, which have been turned into zombies due to a bio-weapon the ship was carrying.
Die for Me	Plum, Amy	2011	The main heroine befriends a group of revenant zombies who sacrifice their lives to save humans, and falls in love with one of them.
Dragon on a Pedestal	Pierce, Anthony	1983	One of the protagonists is a zombie woman who falls in love with a human, and marries him at the end of the novel.
The Enemy	Higson, Charlie	2009	A young adult novel. Surviving youngsters battle adults who have become zombies.
The End	Higson, Charlie	2012	A post-apocalyptic young adult horror novel and the seventh book in a planned seven-book series, titled The Enemy.
The Fallen	Higson, Charlie	2013	A post-apocalyptic young adult horror novel and the fifth book in a planned seven-book series, titled The Enemy.
The Fear	Higson, Charlie	2011	A young adult novel. Surviving youths battle "mothers" and "fathers" who have fallen ill.
Feed	Grant, Mira	2010	News reporters blogging in a world that has, in the main, survived a zombie apocalypse; first novel in the Newsflesh series, followed by Deadline.
Feedback	Grant, Mira	2016	The fourth novel in the Newsflesh series, Feedback covers the same time period as Feed from the perspective of a different set of characters.
The Forest of Hands and Teeth	Ryan, Carrie	2009	Teen book. In a village generations after the zombie apocalypse a 16-year-old struggles with her town's religious rules until the village walls are breached and she is forced to flee into the woods.
Friday the 13th: The Jason Strain	Faust, Christa	2006	An attempt at replicating the immortality and healing factor of Jason Voorhees goes wrong, and results in a zombie plague.
Geeks vs. Zombies	Higson, Charlie	2012	A companion short story book in The Enemy series portrays an exclusive scene from The Fear (2011), on World Book Day.
Generation Dead	Waters, Daniel	2008	Teen book. In the present day, U.S. teens are randomly rising from the dead, and the country is in turmoil over the question of zombie civil rights.
The Girl with All the Gifts	Carey, M.R.	2014	In a dystopian future, most of humanity is wiped out by a fungal infection. The infected quickly lose their mental powers and feed on the flesh of healthy humans. In 2017, Carey published a prequel, The Boy on the Bridge.
Hadriana in All My Dreams	Depestre, René	1988	In Haiti, a young French woman is turned into a zombie on her wedding day. Winner of the 1988 Prix Renaudot.
Handling the Undead	Lindqvist, John Ajvide	2005	During a massive heatwave the unexplained resurrection of thousands of recently deceased people begins in Stockholm, Sweden. David, whose wife has recently died, has gone to the morgue to identify remains of his lost love only to find that she has begun to move. It's terrifying to David, but gives him a strange kind of hope.
Herbert West--Reanimator	Lovecraft, H.P.	1921	Medical doctor invents a serum that re-animates corpses.
History is Dead: A Zombie Anthology	Paffenroth, Kim (Editor)	2007	Twenty short stories by twenty different authors with zombies in alternate histories.
The Hunted	Higson, Charlie	2014	A post-apocalyptic young adult horror novel and the sixth book in a planned seven-book series, titled The Enemy.
Husk	Redekop, Corey	2012	A blackly humorous take on the genre, as an unwilling but terribly hungry zombie strives to continue his career as an actor.
Illuminatus!	Shea, Robert and Wilson, Robert Anton	1976	In the third volume, Leviathan, opens with a rock festival on the shores of Lake Totenkopf in Bavaria. Unknown to all except the heroes and the villains, the bodies of an entire division of the Waffen-SS were interred on an underwater plateau supported by a "biomystical field" to maintain bodily integrity. At the climax of the festival, they will return to life as zombies, surface, and slaughter all 250,000 hippies at the festival.
Kiss of Life	Waters, Daniel	2009	Teen book. Sequel to Generation Dead.
The Living Dead 2	Adams, John Joseph	2010	A collection of 44 short stories about zombies includes contributions by Max Brooks, Robert Kirkman, and David Wellington.
The Magic Island	William Seabrook	1929	An account of the author's travels in Haiti, which is considered the first English language book about zombies. It influenced the rise of the zombie genre in American film.
Midnight Tides	Erikson, Steven	2004	One of the main characters is a zombie pirate woman who likes to seduce living men.
Monster Island	Wellington, David	2006	In New York City, the dead walk the streets. From the other side of the planet, a small but heavily armed group of schoolgirls-turned-soldiers comes in search of desperately needed medicine, with a former UN weapons inspector as their local guide.
Monster Nation	Wellington, David	2006	A prequel to Monster Island where a sentient zombie tries to cure herself.
Monster Planet	Wellington, David	2007	Sentient zombies are intent on taking over the world killing the living with a nuclear weapon.
Les morts ont marché	Mathieu Fortin	2011	In Saint-Liconet, a zombie outbreak took place. To try finding who was the first living dead among the eight last suspects, you read interviews with witnesses, autopsy reports, and proofs analysis reports.
Necromancer	Scott, Harper	2009	Sequel to Predators or Prey?. Monster hunter Wendy Markland fights zombies in the Pine Barrens of New Jersey.
On the Far Side of the Cadillac Desert With Dead Folks	Lansdale, Joe R.	1989	A bounty hunter chases his quarry in a land where the "dead folks" have re-animated due to a bacterium which has escaped a lab.
On Stranger Tides	Powers, Tim	1988	Puppeteer John Chandagnac, who was sailing to Jamaica, has no choice but to join the buccaneers who have taken him prisoner. Blackbeard is assembling an empire of ruthless navy of pirates, living and undead, to voyage to the fabled Fountain of Youth. John, now known as Jack Shandy, tries to free himself from Blackbeard's deadly supernatural domination.
Patient Zero: A Joe Ledger Novel	Maberry, Jonathan	2009	A radical Middle Eastern terrorist group plans to release a deadly bio-weapon on the American people.
Pontypool Changes Everything	Burgess, Tony	1998	The dark side of humanity as an epidemic virus terrorizes the earth.
Pride and Prejudice and Zombies	Grahame-Smith, Seth	2009	Mashup combining Jane Austen's classic 1813 novel Pride and Prejudice with elements of modern zombie fiction.
Pride and Prejudice and Zombies: Dawn of the Dreadfuls	Hockensmith, Steve	2010	Prequel to Pride and Prejudice and Zombies.
Pride and Prejudice and Zombies: Dreadfully Ever After	Hockensmith, Steve	2011	Sequel to Pride and Prejudice and Zombies.
Le protocole Reston	Mathieu Fortin	2009	In the city of Trois-Rivières, a mutant Asian monster escapes from a boat and a zombie outbreak begins. The governments try to keep the story from the media while a high school teacher and his roommate try to survive to their zombie neighbour.
Raising Stony Mayhall	Gregory, Daryl	2011	Set in 1968, after the first zombie apocalypse, the body of a teenage mother is discovered in the snow, clutching a dead baby. The dead child begins to grow.
Resident Evil: Caliban Cove	Perry, S.D.	1998	A paramilitary force investigates an Umbrella cover facility.
Resident Evil: City of the Dead	Perry, S.D.	1999	Adaptation of Resident Evil 2.
Resident Evil: Code Veronica	Perry, S.D.	2001	Adaptation of Resident Evil – Code: Veronica.
Resident Evil: Nemesis	Perry, S.D.	2000	Adaptation of Resident Evil 3.
Resident Evil: The Umbrella Conspiracy	Perry, S.D.	1998	Adaptation of Resident Evil.
Resident Evil: Underworld	Perry, S.D.	1999	A monster-creation lab is targeted for destruction.
Resident Evil: Zero Hour	Perry, S.D.	2004	Adaption of Resident Evil 0.
The Rising	Keene, Brian	2004	Demons possess the bodies of the dead, including animals. One man attempts to reach his son.
The Sacrifice	Higson, Charlie	2012	A post-apocalyptic young adult horror novel and the fourth book in a planned seven-book series, titled The Enemy.
The Stupidest Angel: A Heartwarming Tale of Christmas Terror	Moore, Christopher	2004	In his inept attempt to bring "Santa" back to life, an angel causes the townspeople of Pine Cove to fall under siege by brain-hungry zombies who arise from their burial plots.
Undead	Russo, John A.	2010	A novelization of Night of the Living Dead and a sequel called Return of the Living Dead.
Under a Graveyard Sky	Ringo, John	2013	The story of a family escaping a zombie epidemic in the US on a sailboat and the beginning of the process of finding survivors on the high seas as a prelude to retaking the mainland. Book one of the Black Tide Rising series.
The Walking Dead: Rise of the Governor	Kirkman, Robert and Bonasinga, Jay	2011	It depicts the journey of Philip Blake in the early days of the undead apocalypse to his eventual rise as "The Governor" of Woodbury.
The Walking Dead: The Road to Woodbury	Kirkman, Robert and Bonasinga, Jay	2012	It follows the travails of Lilly Caul who finds herself coming in contact with the "Governor" of Woodbury, a refuge amongst the zombie apocalypse that is not what it seems. The second of a planned trilogy.
Warm Bodies	Marion, Isaac	2010	R is a zombie who is a little different than his fellow Dead. He meets Julie Grigio, a Living girl, and ends up falling in love.
World War Z	Brooks, Max	2007	An oral history told by many survivors of the start, during, and aftermath of the zombie apocalypse.
Zom-B	Shan, Darren	2012	Series of 13 books written from 2012-2016 for teenagers. When zombies attack B's school, B is forced on a mad dash through the serpentine corridors, making allegiances with anyone with enough guts to fight off their pursuers.
Zombie Apocalypse!	Jones, Stephen	2010	A mosaic novel in which interconnected narratives create a unique vision of the end of the world brought about by a plague.
Zombie Apocalypse! Fightback	Jones, Stephen	2012	The sequel to Zombie Apocalypse! The human fightback against the legions of the walking dead begins.
The Zombie Survival Guide	Brooks, Max	2003	An earnest discussion of various survival techniques in a world threatened by zombies.
Zombies: A Record of the Year of Infection	Roff, Don	2009	A man writes in his bird watching journal about trying to survive in a zombie apocalypse.
Zone One	Whitehead, Colson	2011	Mark Spitz is a "sweeper," clearing away stragglers from Manhattan's Zone One district after the zombie attacks. These trapped souls are malfunctioning zombies, destined to ceaselessly repeat mundane acts they carried out while alive.

== Nonfiction ==
Name	Author	Year
Gospel of the Living Dead: George Romero's Visions of Hell on Earth	Paffenroth, Kim	2006
Theories of International Politics and Zombies	Drezner, Daniel W.	2010
The Undead and Philosophy: Chicken Soup for the Soulless	Greene, Richard V. and Mohammad,K. Silem	2006
The Zombie Movie Encyclopedia	Dendle, Peter	2000
Triumph of The Walking Dead: Robert Kirkman's Zombie Epic on Page and Screen	Lowder, James (Editor)	2011

== Comic books ==
Name	Author	Artist	Year	Issue(s)
28 Days Later: The Aftermath	Niles, Steve	Calero, Dennis, Almos, Diego, Branch, Ken and Jones, Nat	2007	One-shot issue
Black Panther	Hudlin, Reginald	Portela, Francis	2005	#27-31
Blackgas	Ellis, Warren	Fiumara, Max	2006	#1-3 A small island is overcome by a mysterious force that turns people into violent cannibals.
Containment	Red, Eric	Stakal, Nick	2005	#1-5
Cursed	Avery, Fiona Kai and Blevins, Tippi	Molenaar, Romano	2003	#1-4
Dawn of the Dead	Romero, George A. (original story) and Niles, Steve (adaption)	Chee Yang Ong	2004	#1-3
Dead@17	Howard, Josh	Howard, Josh	2003	#1-4
Dead@17: Blood of Saints	Howard, Josh	Howard, Josh	2004	#1-4
Dead@17: Protectorate	Hamby, Alex	Hall, Benjamin	2005	#1-3
Dead@17: Revolution	Howard, Josh	Howard, Josh	2004	#1-4
Dead@17: Rough Cut	Howard, Josh, Hamby, Alex, Embry Egg, Burns, Jason M., Hopkins, David and Bussey, Pat	Howard, Josh, Abel, Martin, Benjamin Hall, Law, Scotty, Stephens, Sean and Bussey, Pat	2004	#1-3
Deadworld	Reed, Gary	Locke, Vince and Makkonen, Sami	1987	
Escape of the Living Dead	Russo, John A.	Verma, Dheeraj	2005	#1-5
Highschool of the Dead	Sato, Daisuke and Sato, Shouji	Sato, Shoji	2006	
Land of the Dead	Romero, George A. (original story) and Ryall, Chris	Gabriel Rodriguez	2005	
Living with the Dead	Richardson, Mike	Stenbeck, Ben	2007	
Marvel Zombies	Millar, Mark and Kirkman, Roberts	Phillips, Sean	2005	#1-5
Marvel Zombies 2	Kirkman, Robert	Phillips, Sean	2007	#1-5 Cosmically powered zombies try to help the last few known human survivors. Others try to eat them.
Marvel Zombies 3	Van Lente, Fred	Walker, Kev	2008	#1-4
Marvel Zombies 4	Van Lente, Fred	Walker, Kev	2009	#1-4
Marvel Zombies 5	Van Lente, Fred	Lopez, Jose Angel Cano	2010	#1-5
Marvel Zombies: Dead Days	Kirkman, Robert	Phillips, Sean	2007	Oneshot
Marvel Zombies Return	Van Lente, Fred	Dragotta, Nick	2009	#1-5
Marvel Zombies vs. Army of Darkness	Layman, John	Neves, Fabiano	2007	#13, #1-5
Night of the Living Dead	Romero, George A. and Russo John (original story) Skulan, Tom and Stanway, Eric (adaption)	Kastro, Carlos with Meheu, Eric	1991	
Night of the Living Dead	Hannan, Noel	Rawling, Rik	1994	
Raise the Dead	Moore, Leah and Reppion, John	Hugo Petrus	2007	
Rebel Blood	Riley Rossmo and Alex Link	Riley Rossmo	2012	#1-4
Remains	Niles, Steve	Dwyer, Kieron	2004	#1-5
Resident Evil	Paul W. S. Anderson	Odagawa, Ryan, Bermejo, Lee and D'Anda, Carlos	1998	#1-5
Resident Evil – Code: Veronica	Chung Hing, Lee and King Sum, Hui	King Sum, Hui	2002	#1-4
Shaun of the Dead	Pegg, Simon and Wright, Edgar (original story) Ryall, Chris (adaption)	Howard, Zach	2005	#1-4
Sonic the Hedgehog	Flynn, Ian	Yardley, Tracy, Bryce Thomas, Adam, Stanley, Evan, Lawrence, Jack, Tramontano, Priscilla	2019	#13-29 and one annual, depicts manmade virus which transforms organisms into metallic zombie-like beings
Strange Killings: Necromancer	Ellis, Warren	Wolfer, Mike	2004	
Tales of the Zombie	Gerber, Steve	Marcos, Pablo	1973	#1-10 and one annual
Toe Tags	Romero, George A.	Castillo, Tommy	2004	#1-6
Ultimate Fantastic Four	Millar, Mark	Land, Greg	2005	#21-23, #30-32
Unsounded	Ashley Cope		2010	
Victorian Undead	Edginton, Ian	Fabbri, Davide	2010	#1-6
Victorian Undead II	Edginton, Ian	Fabbri, Davide	2011	#1-5, plus a one-shot special
The Walking Dead	Kirkman, Robert	Moore, Tony and Adlard, Charlie	2003	#1-193
Xombie: Reanimated (Volume 1)	Farr, James	Lovett, Nate	2008	
The Zombie Survival Guide: Recorded Attacks	Brooks, Max	Roberson, Ibraim	2009	One-shot graphic novel

== See also ==
- List of apocalyptic and post-apocalyptic fiction
