= Kiss of Life =

Kiss of Life often refers to:

- Mouth-to-mouth resuscitation, a form of artificial ventilation

Kiss of Life may also refer to:

== Music ==
- Kiss of Life (group), a South Korean girl group formed in 2023

=== Albums ===
- Kiss of Life (album), a 1988 album by Siedah Garrett
- Kiss of Life (EP), by South Korean girl group Kiss of Life
- Kiss of Life, a 1989 album by the Gothic rock band Gene Loves Jezebel

=== Songs ===
- "Kiss of Life" (Sade song), 1992
- "Kiss of Life" (Ken Hirai song), 2001
- "Kiss of Life" (Friendly Fires song), 2009
- "Kiss of Life" (Supergrass song), 2004
- "Kiss of Life" (Kylie Minogue and Jessie Ware song), 2021
- "Kiss of Life", a 1982 song by Peter Gabriel from Security
- "Kiss of Life", a 1993 song by the Bee Gees from Size Isn't Everything

== Other uses ==
- Kiss of Life (2003 film), a British drama
- Kiss of Life (2007 film), a Greek romantic comedy
- "Kiss of Life", a photograph by Rocco Morabito
- Kiss of Life, a 2009 zombie novel by Daniel Water; the sequel to Generation Dead
