= Blackout (Grant novel) =

2012 science fiction/horror novel by Mira Grant

- First edition
- Author: Seanan McGuire (writing as Mira Grant)
- Language: English
- Series: Newsflesh
- Genre: Science fiction/horror
- Publisher: Orbit Books
- Publication date: June 1, 2012
- Publication place: United States
- Pages: 672 pp
- ISBN: 0316081078
- OCLC: 760978103
- Preceded by: Deadline
- Followed by: Rise: The Complete Newsflesh Collection

Blackout is the third book in the Newsflesh series of science fiction/horror novels set after a zombie apocalypse, written by Seanan McGuire under the pen name Mira Grant. It was published by Orbit Books on June 1, 2012. It was preceded by Feed (2010) and Deadline (2011). In 2016, it was followed by both Rise: The Complete Newsflesh Collection and Feedback.

== Plot ==
Shaun Mason, having discovered his immunity to the virus, is helping with Dr. Abbey's research. Other surviving members of the After the End Times team include Rebecca "Becks" Atherton, Mahir Gowda, Maggie Garcia, and Alaric Kwong. Dr. Abbey asks Shaun and Rebecca to travel to zombie-infested Florida and recover live mosquitoes for study. Shaun plans to ask his adoptive parents, the Masons, for assistance. He offers them Georgia's materials in exchange for a path into Florida. When Shaun meets them in Berkeley, California, he realizes that the Masons have betrayed them. The Masons have a change of heart at the last minute; Shaun and Becks barely escape the CDC. Shaun and Becks return to Seattle, where Maggie and Mahir have contacted an the identity forger known as the Monkey. The Monkey agrees to help them disappear if the bloggers will steal information from the Seattle CDC facility. Shaun and his companions break into the facility.

Meanwhile, Georgia awakens as a prisoner in a CDC facility and quickly concludes that she is a clone. With the help of Epidemic Intelligence Service (EIS) undercover agents, Georgia learns she shares most of the memories of the original Georgia and is intended as a "showroom model" for the technology of resurrection through cloning. She also learns that other Georgia clones have been created, including a less accurate but more compliant version that the CDC will use against Shaun. A mole in the EIS team betrays them to the CDC. Georgia escapes and destroys the other clones.

Georgia encounters the After the End Times team during her escape. Shaun accepts her immediately, but the others are initially reluctant. Her mannerisms and knowledge of Georgia's life gradually convince the group that she is a real, accurate clone. The group goes to see the Monkey; they are betrayed by one of his subordinates. A CDC squad attacks. The Monkey and his workers are killed. Maggie is wounded. The rest of the team returns to Dr. Abbey's lab, where an EIS agent is waiting to transport them to Washington, D.C. They are taken to the White House by Rick Cousins (a former After the End Times journalist, now Vice President of the United States).

They learn that President Peter Ryman is being coerced to continue the conspiracy. The CDC has learned that reservoir conditions can induce immunity to Kellis-Amberlee in some cases. Very rarely, someone who has been bitten can recover from zombification. The CDC fears that people will fear to shoot their infected friends and family members on the slim chance of recovery, leading to more outbreaks and deaths. Therefore, they are attempting to cover up the truth. EIS agents and the CDC fight inside the White House. The CDC initiates an outbreak, during which Becks sacrifices herself. The survivors head to an EIS facility, where Shaun and Georgia help Ryman address the world. He apologies for his role in the conspiracy. Mahir helps the After the End Times to upload documents about the CDC's crimes. As the world comes to terms with the revelations, the EIS takes over the CDC. Georgia and Shaun head to the wilds of Canada to escape the limelight.

== Background ==
Shortly before the 22 May release of Blackout (2012), McGuire released Fed, an alternate ending to the first Newsflesh novel, Feed (2010). The alternate ending was initially made available on Facebook on 17 May, then released online by Orbit on 23 May.

== Reception ==
Deadline was nominated for the 2012 Romantic Times Reviewers’ Choice for Science Fiction Novel, as well as the 2013 Hugo Award for Best Novel, though it lost to John Scalzi's Redshirts (2012).
