= The Dead (Higson novel) =

2010 novel by Charlie Higson

The Dead (The Enemy 2)
- Author: Charlie Higson
- Language: English
- Series: The Enemy
- Genre: Horror, Young adult, Thriller
- Publisher: Puffin Books
- Publication date: 16 September 2010
- Publication place: United Kingdom and the rest of Europe
- Media type: Print (Hardcover)
- Pages: 450
- ISBN: 978-0-14-138465-8
- Preceded by: The Enemy
- Followed by: The Fear

The Dead is a novel written by Charlie Higson. The book, published by Puffin Books in the UK on 16 September 2010, is the second book in a seven-book series, titled The Enemy. The Dead takes place in London, a year before the events in the previous book (The Enemy, released in the UK by Puffin Books on 3 September 2009), two weeks after a worldwide sickness has infected adults turning them into something related to voracious, cannibalistic zombies.

Puffin Books released the third novel in the series, titled The Fear, on 15 September 2011; the fourth novel, The Sacrifice, on 20 September 2012; the fifth novel, The Fallen, on 12 September 2013; the sixth novel, The Hunted, on 4 September 2014; and the final book, The End, on 10 November 2015. Disney Hyperion released Higson's short story companion book in the series, titled Geeks vs. Zombies, on 5 June 2012; it portrays an exclusive scene from The Fear, on World Book Day.

== Plot ==
One year before the events in The Enemy, an unnamed user posts a video on YouTube titled "The Scared Kid", in which a boy frantically talks to the camera about how his friends Danny and Eve have been killed by "mothers and fathers" (zombies) and shows them standing outside his window. He then suffers a nervous breakdown and ends the video. The video goes viral, with people not knowing if it is real or not. Eventually the video is taken down, followed by the site itself, followed by the internet, and finally electricity entirely. This marks the point that people realize that something bad is going on, and signals the start of the apocalypse.

Two weeks into the apocalypse, two 14-year-old boys, named Jack and Ed, are trapped with a group of other schoolboys in a boarding school in Kent, where they are defending themselves from their now-zombified teachers. After escaping with the help of a rugby player named Bam, Jack and Ed rescue their French teacher's daughter, Frederique, and make their way to a nearby chapel, where a group led by a boy named Matt barricaded themselves inside a few days prior. Alarmed by the lack of a reply from inside the chapel, they break in and find that those hiding inside have either fallen unconscious or died from carbon monoxide poisoning.

The group manages to revive the survivors, and Matt appears to have suffered brain damage from the poisoning. He believes himself to be the messenger of a being called the Lamb, who he explains will come down to earth and cleanse it of "nonbelievers" (the zombies). He is convinced he must go to St Paul's Cathedral to fulfil the needs of his "god". The group splits, with Matt and some survivors he has brought into his religion attempting to go to London with Jack (who wants to find his family home), and the rest (including Ed, Bam and one of Ed's best friends, Malik) deciding to go deeper into the countryside (thinking it will be safer).

Ed's group is ambushed by older, infected teenagers, who kill half the group, seemingly including Malik. They are saved by the timely arrival of a motor coach driven by an adult named Greg Thorne, who claims he is immune to the disease. With his young son Liam, Greg has acquired the motor coach and is collecting children to transport them all to London. He and Liam want to visit Arsenal Stadium, unaware that it is an adult nest. On the bus, Ed's group meets three girls, Aleisha, Courtney and Brooke. Brooke immediately develops a crush on Ed, whilst Greg eventually catches up with Matt's group, who are all still journeying towards London.

After finding the others and picking them up, Greg explains that, before the apocalypse, he was staying with a farmer and his family, but he had to kill the father and the older children. He says a younger child, who'd gone crazy after losing his family, "didn't make it", indirectly revealing that he had killed the boy and made him into the dried meat he was seen eating. After a close call where Greg nearly leaves Jack and Frederique behind to a group of zombies, the motor coach stops for the night on the outskirts of London. Liam finds out that Greg is infected, and knowing that he cannot protect him anymore, Greg strangles and kills him.

The next morning, Ed finds Greg inexplicably wearing Liam's glasses. Jack and Ed confront him about Liam's death. This causes him to succumb to the virus, which is revealed after Jack, who gets mad at the discovery, attempts to disarm a shotgun that Greg is wielding. The arm-to-the-face maneuver that he inflicted causes Greg to crash the motor coach. Afterward, he completely succumbs and attacks the kids whilst the bus is simultaneously assaulted by several adults. Most of the group escapes and makes it to the Imperial War Museum in South London. Greg wanders off into the streets, whilst the "Bus Party" meets the museum's leader, Jordan, and his second in command DogNut (who develops a crush on Brooke). Jordan refuses to let them stay, eventually compromising and letting them stay as long as they collect food for themselves.

The group sets off, finding a Tesco truck full of non-perishable food. Whilst they are attempting to get the truck to run, Frederique is surrounded by several adults. The other kids fight off the adults and are surprised to find that Frederique is unharmed. Whilst they are driving the truck back to the museum, Jack and Bam tell Ed that they are planning on going to Jack's old house and hop out to go off on their own. Ed eventually decides to join them, kisses Brooke and catches up with the two boys, unaware that they are being followed by a now fully zombified Greg.

Meanwhile, back at the museum, Matt's religion has gained more believers. Matt foretells that the Lamb will look like a blond boy and will have a darker shadow; another boy, nicknamed "The Goat", must be sacrificed so that "The Lamb has no shadow" and is capable of cleansing the earth. Frederique attacks a young boy named Froggie, biting into his arm. She reveals to Ed that she is 16 years old and is infected, but her disease took longer to manifest than it did for others. Several of Jordan's kids lock her in a storeroom.

Jack, Ed and Bam make their way to The Oval cricket ground, finding dozens of emergency vehicles outside filled with dead bodies. Despite Ed's hesitation, Bam and Jack kill two soldiers and a policeman. The boys explore, finding and keeping several weapons. They find that the stadium is full of diseased corpses that were stacked to be burned, as well as numerous bodies seated in the stands, but the law enforcement and medical officials were themselves killed or succumbed to the infection before they had a chance to finish the job. The boys learn not all the bodies are dead and are then pursued by adults through the stadium. Jack accidentally shoots a propane tank with a submachine gun whilst trying to fend off an attacker, causing it to explode and setting off an avalanche of corpses. Ed is buried underneath the bodies whilst Jack and Bam are buried underneath the debris resulting from a partially collapsed section of the stadium. Bam mistakes Jack for an adult and shoots him with the shotgun that he had recovered from Greg. Jack is badly wounded in the side, but able to stand. Ed finds them, and the three boys leave, continuing their trek to Jack's house.

In the street, the group are ambushed by adults whom the three boys manage to kill, but as they do a victory dance for killing the rather large group, Greg appears and kills Bam with a meat cleaver to the head. He then slashes Jack's chest open and cuts the side of Ed's face from forehead to chin. Greg is about to finish off Ed, but flees when Ed mentions Liam's name aloud. Ed drags a fading Jack to his home and tries to heal his friend's wounds. However, Jack is beyond repair. Ed takes Jack to his bedroom and keeps him company throughout the night with him. In the morning, Ed finds Jack has died from his injuries. Ed cremates his friend by burning the entire house down, and heads back to the museum under a spreading cloud of smoke and ash emanating from a large fire they'd seen earlier in South London.

Soon, Ed is ambushed again by adults, only to be rescued by David and his group. Together, they all travel to the museum. David warns Ed that the fire is spreading towards the museum, and the group should relocate. At the museum, Ed manages to stitch his cheek, leaving him with a large scar. He confronts Frederique, who has escaped captivity by gnawing off her own thumb to slip out of her handcuffs. Ed defeats her and, against Jordan's advice to kill her so she won't kill someone else, manages to banish her into the streets. Ed holds council with David and Jordan, with Ed and David deciding to move to North London. Jordan decides to stay in the museum with his original group.

Ed and David make a deal: in exchange for receiving food from the Tesco truck, on which Ed's group will ride, David's group will accompany the truck on foot, clearing the congestion and debris blocking the truck's path. Armed with additional weapons from the museum, Ed and David lead their respective groups and attempt to cross the Lambeth Bridge. Every other kid in South London is also trying to cross the river, and they all struggle to do so due to congestion and a commotion between kids further up the bridge. A huge wave of infected adults comes up behind the kids from the south, and Ed and several other fighters, including Courtney and Aleisha, hang back to fend off the infected whilst Brooke and the others drive on. Brooke decides to split off from David's group after she sees him shoot a boy in the chest. Frederique reappears and attacks Aleisha, injuring her, resulting in Ed shooting Frederique dead with a pistol. Ed is helped by another boy named Kyle, and although the fighters initially seem to be overwhelmed, they are rescued by Jordan, DogNut and their his crew, who had been forced to abandon the museum.

The fighters flee, but the way back to the bridge is blocked by a horde of adults. The kids manage to take control of a sightseeing cruise boat moored in the river. They pilot it downstream towards the Tower of London, but Matt hijacks the boat in an attempt to reach St Paul's Cathedral. He accidentally crashes the boat into the bridge and it splits in half, causing a number of kids to drown, including Aleisha. Matt and his surviving acolytes are last seen disappearing under a bridge, standing on the top of half of the ruined boat.

Jordan, Ed, Kyle and the survivors find lifeboats and navigate them to the river's north bank. They make their way to the Tower and enter it by climbing the drainpipes. Inside, they find a group of about thirty kids already inhabiting the castle. Frustrated with the current leader, Jordan takes control, with Ed as his right-hand man. Of the original group from the bus, only Ed and Courtney remain. The others are either dead, missing or still with the Tesco truck. Meanwhile, Greg finds himself in Trafalgar Square and puts on a St. George T-shirt from a souvenir stand, deciding to get revenge on those he holds responsible for Liam's death. It is also revealed that he intends to raise an army of adults, revealing him as the "Saint George" adult from the previous novel.

One year later, DogNut decides to leave the Tower with a group of people, including Courtney, to search for Brooke and the other kids. A few days after this, Ed, Kyle and Jordan witness Small Sam and the Kid arrive at The tower, and are shocked to find that they look identical to the Lamb and the Goat children from Matt's prophecy.

== Characters ==
=== Rowhurst ===
- Arthur – Wiki's best friend. Arthur is nicknamed "Jibber-Jabber" (by Greg, though the nickname sticks) because he talks constantly.
- Chris Marker – A boy who never stops reading and believes he sees ghosts. He appears to be schizophrenic, as he mentions therapy and doctors from earlier in his life.
- Ed Carter – One of the main characters in the book, he is a handsome, popular boy from Rowhurst and Jack's best friend. His face is scarred after Greg Thorne attacks him with a meat cleaver. He assumes leadership of the group after they escape the motorcoach.
- Frederique Morel – A French girl whom the Rowhurst students find while escaping their school. Frederique develops a romantic connection with Jack, but this is never fully established because she becomes infected, due to her mature age. The Rowhurst students expel her from the Imperial War Museum, and later she reappears at the battle on the bridge and bites Aleisha. Immediately after this, she regains control of herself long enough to let Ed shoot and kill her.
- Harry "Bam" Bamford – A student from Rowhurst. Bam is a strong, powerful, enthusiastic rugby player, much respected by everyone because he is the best fighter of the group. He is killed in a fight with Greg Thorne, who attacks him from behind with a meat cleaver.
- Jack – A main character in the book. A student from Rowhurst, Jack is Ed's best friend and dies from multiple wounds sustained when Bam shoots him and Greg stabs him. Ed carries him back to Jack's family's house where he dies peacefully in his bed. When Ed leaves, he burns the house so that Jack's body doesn't get eaten by the adults.
- Johnno – One of the Rowhurst rugby players who is killed during the ambush at the Fez.
- Justin – The last of the three nerds. He is put in charge of driving the Tesco truck. Later in the book is in charge of driving with Brooke across the busy bridge.
- Kwanele Nkosi – A fashion-obsessed African student from Rowhurst. Kwanele is cowardly and unwilling to help out with anything for fear of ruining his clothes. Ed Carter is greatly annoyed by this behaviour.
- Piers – One of the rugby players from Rowhurst and a friend of Bams. He is injured early in the novel, and dies when Kwanele and Ed leave him on the bus.
- The Sullivan Brothers - Twin rugby players from Rowhurst named Damien and Anthony. Both are killed at the Fez.
- Wiki – A small boy who seems to know everything, hence his nickname. His real name is Thomas.

=== The Church at Rowhurst ===
- Archie Bishop – A member of "The Lamb" religion formed by Matthew. His father was a vicar and he is Matthew's right-hand man. At the end of the novel, his fate is unknown.
- Harry Ryan - A member of "The Lamb" religion formed by Matthew. He is excellent at calligraphy. He makes the banner for the religion, but misspells it as "Angus Day". This angers Matt, but others suggest that "The Lamb" influenced him to misspell the banner. At the end of the novel, it is unclear whether Harry is dead or floating downriver with Matt and his acolytes on the remains of the boat.
- Jacob - An asthmatic boy in the church. When Ed, Jack, and their group enter, he is already dead from carbon monoxide poisoning.
- Malik – A Muslim friend of Ed Carter's, from Rowhurst. Malik is taken by sickos in the ambush at the Fez; it is later revealed in the sixth novel that he survived.
- Matthew Palmer – A Rowhurst student who suffered carbon monoxide poisoning at the church. Following the poisoning and the emotional trauma from the disease epidemic, Matthew forms a religion about a boy known as "The Lamb", who makes things right. He is nicknamed "Mad Matt" by others in the group because of this. He hijacks the sightseeing boat but crashes it, then floats downriver on its remains, with his second in command, Archie Bishop, and four acolytes. At the end of the novel, his fate is unknown.
- Phil - A small boy who joins Matt's "The Lamb" religion and becomes its youngest acolyte. At the end of the novel, it is unclear if he is dead, or among those floating down the river on the remains of the boat.
- Stanley - A small boy at the church who does not join Matt's religion initially. He attempts to leave with the majority of the group for the countryside but is presumably killed during the ambush at the Fez.

=== The Coach group ===
- Aleisha – A girl student on Greg Thorne's coach, who is best friends with Brooke and Courtney. Aleisha gets bitten and later drowns, when the cruise boat sinks.
- Brooke – A girl student on Greg Thorne's coach, who is best friends with Aleisha and Courtney. Brooke becomes emotionally close to Ed Carter, until Greg scars Ed's face. At the end of the book, she is horrified by witnessing David shoot a kid on the bridge and tells Justin to keep driving.
- Courtney – A girl student on Greg Thorne's coach, who is best friends with Aleisha and Brooke. Courtney travels with Ed to the Tower of London.
- Froggie – Zohra's brother. The two cute little siblings enjoy chatting with Arthur, Justin, and Wiki. Froggie is bitten by Frederique Morel, but he is fine afterward. He is seven years old and looks a bit like a frog.
- Liam Thorne – Greg Thorne's young son. When Greg realizes he is not immune to the disease and, because he has become infected, he cannot care for Liam, he strangles his son. Greg then carries Liam's body wherever he goes, until he later drops it from a bridge.
- Zohra – Froggie's nine-year-old sister. The two cute little siblings enjoy chatting with Arthur, Justin, and Wiki.

=== The Imperial War Museum group ===
- Dognut – A boy in the Imperial War Museum group. Dognut is ratty and wiry, and deeply respects Jordan Hordern, for whom he appears to serve as second-in-command. At the end, Dognut leads a group away from the Tower of London to search for other kids who were separated from their group.
- Jordan Hordern – The leader of the Imperial War Museum group. Jordan is very interested in war and strategy, and he takes control when his group arrives at the Tower of London.

=== David King's group ===
- Andy Thomas - A boy in David's group who has a big nose, and recognizes Ed Carter, as he also played football.
- David King – A posh boy from a private school in Surrey, called St. Hilda's. He rescues Ed and escorts the Rowhurst students across London with his group. He starts as simply sanctimonious and subtly narcissistic, but shows himself to be increasingly psychopathic and violent by nature - a dark side that heavily worsened by the time of The Enemy.
- Pod – A boy who serves as head of security for David King.

=== Adults ===
- Greg Thorne/"Saint George" – Liam Thorne's father; he later calls himself "Saint George". Greg is an adult who claims he is "immune" to the disease. He is driving a coach bringing Aleisha, Brooke, and Courtney back to England after the disease breaks out on their school trip to France. South of London, he picks up the Rowhurst students and Frederique Morel. Later, he becomes infected, dons a shirt decorated with a St George's Cross, and becomes a leader for infected adults. He serves as the book's main antagonist.
- Monsieur Morel – A French teacher at Rowhurst, and Frederique's father. When the boys try to escape, he leads the infected teachers to attack them, and captures one of them. Jack kills him by hitting him with a plank of wood with nails sticking out, driving the nails into his skull. Frederique is never told exactly what happened to him, but she is told that he is dead.
- Mr. Hewitt – An English teacher at Rowhurst. He tries to help the boys in the early stages of the outbreak, until he came down with the sickness (before the beginning of the book). In the beginning, he tries to eat Jack and Ed, but slices open his stomach crawling through a window, and they escape. The boys later find his head (the adults ate his body) while escaping the school, and throw it in a trash can.
- Mr. Langston – An elderly history teacher at Rowhurst. He pursues the boys and Frederique to the church. As he tries to get the gate open, Jack hits his head with a piece of rebar, and kills him shortly after.
- Ms. Warlock – An English teacher at Rowhurst. She pursues the boys and Frederique when they go to the church. She remains outside while Mr. Langston tries to open the gate. Bam leaps over the wall and knocks her over, and kills her immediately afterward.
- Pez – A young infected man whose cheeks have been slashed through, causing his lower jaw to hang down and rendering him unable to bite, also making him look like a living Pez dispenser. He first appears with a group of adults attacking the coach after Greg turns on the children. After the kids (sans Piers) escape, he appears among the sickos attacking the scavenging group at Tesco. After they escape again, he is among the adults attacking the kids trying to cross Lambeth Bridge. He attempts to bite Ed, but cannot due to his injuries, and Kyle kills him. He has dark hair and yellow eyes.

=== Other characters ===
- Dior - Frederique's cat, who she carries with her in the early stages of the book. It was a gift to her father, the French teacher at Rowhurst, and she feels obligated to care for it, to the point where she nearly causes sickos to attack the group by refusing to abandon it. She later releases Dior after they reach the Imperial War museum, believing the cat will be better off on its own.
- Kyle – A boy Ed meets during the battle on the bridge. Kyle joins Ed's trek through London and serves as his right-hand man at the Tower of London.
- Tomoki - The unofficial leader of the Tower of London group, when Ed and the survivors from the tour boat arrive. His position is taken by Jordan, who is a more effective leader, though Tomoki is allowed to continue representing his group.

== Cultural, historical, and geographical elements ==
Part of the appeal of The Dead, as with Higson's other books, stems from the author's inclusion of accurate geographic details (e.g., the locations of and attractions surrounding various Tesco stores; Jack, Ed, and Bam's trek from the Imperial War Museum to The Oval; the trek of Ed's "bus party" and David King's group from the Imperial War Museum to the Lambeth Bridge); descriptions of various sites and historic events, e.g., the Great Fire of London (1666); and references to popular culture, e.g., the Gormenghast series).
