= I Still See You (film) =

2018 American supernatural film

- Theatrical release poster
- Directed by: Scott Speer
- Written by: Jason Fuchs
- Based on: Break My Heart 1000 Times by Daniel Waters
- Produced by: Paul Brooks; Leon Clarance
- Starring: Bella Thorne; Richard Harmon; Thomas Elms; Dermot Mulroney; Amy Price-Francis; Shaun Benson
- Cinematography: Simon Dennis
- Edited by: Paul Covington
- Music by: Bear McCreary
- Production companies: Gold Circle Entertainment; Motion Picture Capital
- Distributed by: Lionsgate
- Release date: October 12, 2018 (United States)
- Running time: 97 minutes
- Country: United States
- Language: English
- Box office: $1.6 million

I Still See You is a 2018 American supernatural mystery thriller film, directed by Scott Speer, from a screenplay by Jason Fuchs and based on the novel Break My Heart 1000 Times by Daniel Waters. It stars Bella Thorne, Richard Harmon and Dermot Mulroney.

The film was released on October 12, 2018 by Lionsgate.

== Plot ==
An explosion at Dr. Martin Steiner's Ashburn Laboratories in Chicago kills countless people. Indistinguishable from humans, ghostly specters in the form of the event's victims begin haunting the world as non-sentient "remnants" that briefly repeat certain actions at daily intervals.

Ten years later, high school student Veronica "Ronnie" Calder confronts her mother about how they don't acknowledge her dead father Robert's daily presence at their breakfast table. She becomes frightened by a remnant of a young man whose name she intuitively knows is Brian. Brian writes the word "RUN" on a mirror before vanishing. During a class on remnants taught by Mr. Bittner, Ronnie starts bleeding from her ear. Fearful that Brian wants to harm her, she visits Mr. Bittner at his home but he dismisses her worries.

Knowing of his fascination with remnants, Ronnie convinces new classmate Kirk to help her figure out who Brian is. Kirk's research reveals that Brian was suspected of having abducted and murdered Pastor Greer's daughter Mary. They visit Pastor Greer who tells them she doesn't know who Brian was but adds that Brian killed himself the day after Mary disappeared. Ronnie discovers that she and Mary share the same birthday.

After receiving a phone call from Pastor Greer, school principal Pescatelli summons Kirk to his office to ask about his investigation into Mary Greer's death. At a school basketball game, Ronnie sees visions of Brian, and Principal Pescatelli's body suddenly crashes through the ceiling. Kirk tells Ronnie that he believes Pescatelli died because he told him about their investigation.

The pair connect Brian to the deaths of two more young women: Emma Shaw and Claire White. Claire White's sister Kerry tells them that Brian was her sister's boyfriend. She adds that they can watch Claire's death firsthand at Chicago's 'No-Go Zone'. Ronnie and Kirk brave intense remnants to make their way to where Claire died, which turns out to be Ashburn Laboratories in Darkness Falls.

The pair sees Dr. Martin Steiner, now a disheveled man, among the spectators at Claire's death scene. Steiner explains that he was working on a project that would use living beings as vessels to resurrect the deceased, but the transference required both people to share a birthday. Brian was Steiner's research assistant, and Steiner believed Brian was trying to bring back his victims to make amends for their murders. Relieved of his burden of knowledge, Steiner kills himself.

School administrators take Kirk into custody after finding a gun in his locker. Ronnie goes again to Mr. Bittner for help, and he confides that Kirk was expelled from his previous school for possessing a firearm. Kirk tries explaining to Ronnie that the new gun was planted, but she doesn't believe him. Mr. Bittner vows to keep Ronnie safe for the 48 hours until her birthday, which is when they believe Brian will try to kill her to resurrect one of the dead women. Bittner helps her fortify her house's panic room with lead lining, which is supposed to prevent remnants from passing through.

Kirk discovers that Bittner was actually Dr. Steiner's research partner and goes to Bittner's house. He learns that Bittner has been trying to resurrect his dead daughter Eva. Bittner knocks him unconscious and buries him alive. Ronnie realizes that Bittner was murdering young women who shared his daughter's birthday in hopes of finding a vessel for Eva. He made Brian and Principal Pescatelli's deaths look like suicides when they discovered the truth. She escapes and runs to a frozen lake. When Bittner captures her, she breaks the thin ice, submerging them in freezing water. Mary Greer's ghost drowns Bittner while Brian's ghost saves Ronnie.

As Ronnie struggles to remain conscious, she has memories of her father teaching her to ice skate at that same lake. Kirk arrives in time to pull her from the water. He explains that his father's ghost dug him out of the ground. Ronnie visits her father's grave with Kirk. They resolve to do something now that they are the only two people who know the truth behind the Chicago event. As they leave, Bittner's remnant observes the duo before vanishing.

== Cast ==
- Bella Thorne as Veronica "Ronnie" Calder, a 17-year-old girl who sees her father's "remnants" and feels guilty that she was the cause of his death
- Richard Harmon as Kirk Lane, Ronnie's new friend and later her boyfriend
- Dermot Mulroney as August Bittner
- Amy Price-Francis as Anna Calder, Ronnie's mother
- Hugh Dillon as Mathison
- Shaun Benson as Robert Calder, Ronnie's late father
- Louis Herthum as Doctor Steiner
- Thomas Elms as Brian
- Sara Thompson as Janine
- Marina Stephenson Kerr as Pastor Greer
- Cassandra Potenza as Eva Bittner
- Danika Frederick as Claire White
- Arden Alfonso as Mary Greer
- Dave Brown as Principal Pescatelli

== Production ==
In July 2016, it was announced that Bella Thorne had joined the cast, with Scott Speer directing from a screenplay by Jason Fuchs, and that Paul Brooks should produce with Scott Niemeyer, Brad Kessell and Fuchs as executive producers. Gold Circle Films produced the film. In March 2017, Dermot Mulroney and Richard Harmon joined the cast.

=== Filming ===
Principal photography began in March 2017. Some parts of the movie were filmed in Winnipeg, Canada at a local school, Daniel McIntyre Collegiate Institute. Some other scenes were also filmed at the Arlington Bridge in the city. Many parts of the film based in "Jewel City" were filmed in Carman, Manitoba.

== Reception ==
=== Box office ===
I Still See You grossed $1,359 in the United States and Canada, and $1.1 million in other territories, for a worldwide total of $1.1 million.

=== Critical response ===
On the review aggregator website Rotten Tomatoes, 8% of 13 critics' reviews are positive, with an average rating of 4.1/10. On Metacritic, the film has a weighted average score of 31 out of 100, based on 7 critics, indicating "generally unfavorable" reviews.
