= Rise: The Complete Newsflesh Collection =

2016 short fiction collection by Mira Grant

- Author: Seanan McGuire, writing as Mira Grant
- Language: English
- Series: Newsflesh
- Genre: Science fiction / Horror
- Published: 21 June 2016
- Publisher: Orbit Books
- Publication place: United States
- Pages: 656 (First edition hardcover)
- ISBN: 9780316309585
- Preceded by: Blackout
- Followed by: Feedback

Rise: The Complete Newsflesh Collection is a 2016 collection by Seanan McGuire, writing as Mira Grant. It contains stories set in Grant's Newsflesh universe. The works Countdown and San Diego 2014: The Last Stand of the California Browncoats were both finalists for the Hugo Award for Best Novella.

== Plot ==
=== Countdown ===
By the year 2014, advances in medical technology have cured cancer. Amanda Amberlee’s leukemia has been cured after she was infected with a genetically engineered strain of Marburg virus. Her physician, Dr. Daniel Wells, has similarly cured several other patients.

Meanwhile, Dr. Alexander Kellis researches a cure for the common cold. Journalist Robert Stalnaker believes that the Kellis cure will primarily benefit wealthy elites. A group of activists called the May Day Army, inspired by Stalnaker’s reporting, breaks into the Kellis lab and steals the cure. They release it into the atmosphere before any human trials are conducted. The Kellis virus rapidly spreads through the population.

By July 2014, the Kellis virus meets Marburg Amberlee and begins to mutate. On July 18, the Rising begins. Several people who are coinfected with the Kellis-Amberlee hybrid die, either from accidents or natural causes. Their bodies rise from the dead as zombies, spawning a zombie apocalypse in several cities at the same time.

Dr. Wells is eaten by his own family. Dr. Kellis hangs himself. The government suppresses information about the new virus, fearing that it will spark a panic. A CDC researcher named Dr. Matras breaks the silence, using his daughter’s blog to spread information about the Kellis-Amberlee virus.

Michael and Stephanie Mason live in Berkeley when the Rising begins. Their son Philip is killed by an infected golden retriever.

The novella closes with a quote from the blog of Mahir Gowda.

=== "Everglades" ===
Debbie is a grad student studying herpetology at Berkeley. The Rising begins, trapping her on campus with a group of other students. She recounts a beloved memory from the summer she was eight years old. She visited her grandparents in Florida, and her grandfather took her on a boat ride to see the alligators. Debbie leaves the safety of her building, choosing to be bitten and die quickly rather than live through the end of civilization.

=== San Diego 2014: The Last Stand of the California Browncoats ===
In 2044, Mahir Gowda interviews Lorelei Tutt. Tutt is a former Coast Guard captain and the last known survivor of the 2014 San Diego Comic-Con.

Gowda presents an account of the outbreak. In July 2014, fans flock to Comic-Con despite early warnings about a potential pandemic. The California Browncoats are a volunteer organization helping with the convention. Commander Shawn Tutt, his wife Lynn, and their daughter Lorelei arrive to help at the Browncoats' booth. An irritable Lorelei leaves her parents and returns to the hotel room.

A Kellis-Amberlee outbreak begins during a panel interview, quickly spreading into the main convention hall. The hall is locked down, trapping both the zombies and survivors inside. Television star Elle Riley meets fans Matthew and Patty, who are on their honeymoon. Together, they take shelter in a replica television set.

Convention attendees Kelly, Marty, and a group of other survivors try to turn the WiFi back on. As they move to the access panel, Kelly is bitten. Meanwhile, a blind woman named Lesley locks herself in the control booth with her guide dog Unis. With Lesley's help, they restart the WiFi. Kelly forces her companions to abandon her before she attacks them. Marty’s group meets Elle and her friends, still hiding in the replica movie set. Lesley and Unis are killed when zombies break into the control room.

Shawn contacts Lorelei by walkie-talkie and instructs her to get help from the nearby military base. Two Browncoats are killed while attempting to escape through the parking garage. Lorelei informs her parents that the military plans to bomb the convention center in an attempt to contain the outbreak. Shawn, Lynn, and the three other surviving Browncoats search for an exit.

Elle and Patty are bitten; Matthew gets blood in his eyes. He briefly speaks to Shawn and indicates that the disease is infectious. Based on Matthew’s information, the Browncoats decide to abandon their escape plans for fear of spreading the contagion to the outside world. The Browncoats sing together until the bombs destroy the convention center.

=== How Green This Land, How Blue This Sea ===
Mahir Gowda flies from London to Melbourne. He meets Jack Ward and Olivia Mebberson, two employees of After the End Times. The purpose of Gowda’s trip is to examine the rabbit-proof fence. The fence now serves as a barrier between the infection-heavy territory of Western Australia and the remainder of the country.

The group flies to Western Australia with Juliet, Jack’s ex-wife. They reach the fence just in time to see it attacked by a mob of infected kangaroos. A team of guards shoots a kangaroo, then enters the fence to extract the body for necropsy. The next day, Mahir and Olivia meet Dr. Reynaldo Fajardo at a biological containment facility. Mahir sees several joeys who have been rescued from infected parents.

That evening, Rey, Olivia, Jack, and Juliet take Mahir on an illegal excursion beyond the fence. Rey has been studying reservoir conditions in marsupials. He shows Mahir a mob of kangaroos that are in the process of developing viral immunity. The group is chased by zombie kangaroos and a wombat, but they escape safely. Juliet is arrested for shooting the wombat. She and Jack re-marry.

Mahir returns to London, reflecting that Australia may be the freest country in the world.

=== The Day the Dead Came to Show and Tell ===
In 2044, reporter Alaric Kwong prepares a report on the 2036 tragedy at Seattle’s Evergreen Elementary School.

Elaine Oldenburg teaches first grade in a highly secure facility; regular blood tests are required and students are shackled to their desks to prevent the spread of infection. During recess, a first grader named Scott cuts himself on the playground equipment and hides the blood from Elaine. During the next recess period, a fourth grader named Nathan comes into contact with Scott’s blood.

Nathan begins feeling unwell and is sent to the nurse for blood testing. An architectural design flaw in the pre-Rising building meant that the nurse’s office was connected to the principal’s office without intervening security. Additionally, the only way to contact law enforcement is through the same office.

Elaine’s classroom goes into lockdown. She discovers Scott’s bleeding arm, then realizes that an outbreak has begun in the front office. Elaine orders her class to line up and head towards the parking lot. Two girls sneak away to use the bathroom, where they are eaten by zombies. Elaine and her surviving students run toward the exit, only to find it locked down.

Elaine seeks shelter with Ms. Teeter, whose kindergarten classroom is located near the exit. Zombies break into the classroom. Elaine takes all of the students into a supply closet. Ms. Teeter sacrifices herself to save the students. Elaine begins lifting the surviving students through the drop ceiling. During the crawl, the ceiling collapses. Elaine and most of the students fall to the ground floor. One of the students dies upon impact. Another is severely injured and cannot stop crying. Elaine is forced to kill a kindergartner to prevent his screams from attracting the zombies. Several kindergartners run into the hallway and are eaten, attracting a zombie mob. Elaine and the other survivors run for safety. Most of the students are eaten; Elaine escapes with only four surviving children. She is put on trial for the death of her students, but changes her name and disappears.

Alaric’s discovers that Elaine eventually became Foxy, an associate of the Monkey who appears as a minor character in Blackout.

=== Please Do Not Taunt the Octopus ===
Dr. Shannon Abbey continues her research into Kellis-Amberlee. She lets her dog Joe out for a run in the woods. She hears gunshots, then confronts a woman who shot at Joe. The woman is searching for Dr. Abbey; Abbey invites her back to the lab. The mysterious woman is severely malnourished and withdrawing from multiple drugs.

Dr. Abbey calls Alaric and Maggie from After the End Times. They confirm that the woman is Elaine Oldenburg, AKA Foxy. Elaine tells Dr. Abbey that she was sent by a man named Clive, a drug kingpin. Abbey suspects that Clive is planning an immediate attack on her lab; he watched Elaine being brought inside as a way to assess the lab’s security protocols.

Abbey’s team is able to synthesize psychoactive cannabinoids for Elaine. She agrees to help fight Clive in exchange for the drugs. Clive and a group of hired soldiers attack the lab. Elaine kills Clive and is then shot by one of the soldiers. Elaine survives, and Dr. Abbey offers her a place in the lab.

=== All the Pretty Little Horses ===
During the Rising, five-year-old Phillip Mason is infected by a golden retriever. His mother Stacy is forced to shoot him. She and her husband Michael create a radio station which saves many lives; eventually, the military steps in and restores order. Stacy then falls into a deep depression, believing herself to be a murderer.

Michael arranges for a trip to the Oakland Zoo, where the Masons serve as journalists during a decontamination procedure. He hopes that work will allow Stacy to recover from her depression. Beginning with a report on the zoo, the Masons become blog journalists. Their fame grows; eventually they become the prototype for future Irwins.

The military sends a team to Santa Cruz to search for survivors. The Masons accompany them. The team finds a group of teenagers and children who have been living in Natural Bridges State Park. Several more groups of children are rescued, overloading an already-strained foster care system. The Masons do a feature story on the orphans of the Rising. Eventually, Michael convinces Stacy that they should adopt. The Masons adopt a boy and a girl, naming them Shaun and Georgia.

=== Coming to You Live ===
Three years after the events of Blackout, Shaun and Georgia Mason live in a cabin in rural Canada. Georgia suffers from nightmares about her time in the CDC’s laboratory, while Shaun continues to have hallucinations of the original Georgia.

Georgia begins to bleed from her nose and mouth. She passes out and is discovered by Shaun. When she awakens, they call Dr. Abbey. Dr. Abbey instructs them to meet her in Shady Cove for an in-person examination. When the Masons arrive, Georgia is examined by both Dr. Abbey and Dr. Kimberly. (Note: Dr. Kimberly now leads the EIS. She was the leader of the team who helped the cloned Georgia escape from the CDC during Blackout.) Dr. Abbey also invites several After the End Times team members, allowing Shaun and George to reunite with Mahir, Alaric, and Maggie.

Georgia is diagnosed with multiple organ system failure; this is a result of the cloning procedure that created her. Shaun and Georgia learn that the CDC has continued to experiment with genetic material taken from the original Georgia. Georgia agrees to accept organs from another clone, despite the ethical dilemma that this poses.

Georgia survives her liver and kidney transplant. The transplant triggers a case of retinal KA. Shaun asks Dr. Abbey for medication to manage his hallucinations. The Masons both agree to return to the United States on a regular basis.

== Publication History ==
The collection contains eight works. Six were previously published in digital or limited-edition print formats before being collected. The stories "All the Pretty Horses" and "Coming to you Live" are new to the collection.

"Everglades" was published in the anthology The Living Dead 2, edited by John Joseph Adams and published in 2010. Countdown was first published as an ebook. In 2012, it was collected in When Will You Rise: Stories to End the World, a limited-edition book by Subterranean Press.

== Reception and awards ==
Publishers Weekly called the book satisfying, writing that Grant "expands her clever and disturbing viral zombie apocalypse" with the collection. The review noted that the book would be best enjoyed by established readers, but that "any reader can appreciate Grant's skillful writing." Writing for the New York Times, author N. K. Jemisin called the collection "a rich expansion on a beloved universe." Jemisin felt that the stories set during the Rising itself weakened the collection as a whole; in her view, the strength of the series came from the fact that it did not focus on the zombies themselves.

Jemisin concluded that some of the zombie-focused stories were exciting and horrifying, but that they had significant flaws:

"Still, they lack the media analysis and complexity that made the trilogy so refreshing. New readers may come away thinking of this series as merely fun. They would do better to head straight for the trilogy, leaving the vast horde of longtime fans to devour "Rise" in the spirit it's meant."

Publishers Weekly called Countdown a "wonderful" novella, noting that "Grant excels in humanizing her characters and surrounding them with believable science and circumstances." Terry Weyna of fantasyliterature.com wrote that Countdown was "scientifically sound — and utterly terrifying." N. K. Jemisin praised the way in which the novella humanized the characters involved in the creation of Kellis-Amberlee, including the researchers, test cases, and protestors.

Weyna also reviewed How Green This Land, How Blue This Sea and The Day the Dead Came to Show and Tell, awarding each novella three out of a possible five stars. Weyna felt that the former novella was "a bit preachy" in its criticism of America's treatment of security problems. She felt that the novella was not as good as the original Newsflesh trilogy, but concluded that "despite the lecturing, there’s an exciting adventure here." Of the latter work, Weyna wrote that Grant had so thoroughly explored the setting that the story had become predictable. The review called the story "thoroughly competent" but noted that fans would likely wish for Grant to move on to other series.

Countdown was a finalist for the 2012 Hugo Award for Best Novella. San Diego 2014: The Last Stand of the California Browncoats was a finalist for the same award in the following year.
