= Feedback (novel) =

2016 novel by Mira Grant

- Author: Seanan McGuire, writing as Mira Grant
- Language: English
- Series: Newsflesh
- Genre: Science fiction; horror
- Publisher: Orbit Books
- Publication date: 4 October 2016
- Publication place: United States
- Pages: 496 (hardcover first edition)
- ISBN: 9780316379342
- Preceded by: Rise: The Complete Newsflesh Collection

Feedback is a 2016 horror novel by Seanan McGuire, writing under the pen name Mira Grant. It is part of her Newsflesh universe. Feedback is set decades after a zombie apocalypse and tells the story of a group of journalists who follow the campaign of a Democratic presidential candidate. The events of Feedback take place at the same time as Feed, which featured journalists following a Republican candidate.

== Plot ==
Ben Ross attends his mother’s funeral while his wife, Aislinn “Ash” North, waits outside. Ben and Ash have a lavender marriage which allowed Ash to get American citizenship. Ben and Ash live with Audrey Wen, Ash’s girlfriend, and Mat Newsom, a makeup blogger.

In California, Shaun and Georgia Mason are selected to cover Peter Ryman’s presidential campaign. (Note: Their story is detailed in Feed.) Meanwhile, Democratic Governor Susan Kilburn of Oregon selects Ash’s team to cover her own campaign.

Kilburn’s first campaign event is attacked by zombies, which were buried in a rose garden. Ash realizes that the zombies were intentionally placed in the garden as part of an assassination attempt. Moreover, the zombified victims were taken from disabled and queer communities, two traditionally Democratic voting blocs. Senator Ryman’s team is also affected by an outbreak. Mat uses security data to predict that Kilburn was meant to die, while Ryman was always meant to survive.

Kilburn meets with Republican Congresswoman Kirsten Wagman, a personal friend. Ash’s team meets Rick Cousins, the head of Wagman’s press pool. Wagman shares details about her own campaign, which has also experienced a suspicious outbreak.

At the Democratic National Convention, Kilburn is selected to be the party’s nominee. Ash is almost killed by a mob of zombies outside the convention center. Ash and Ben conclude that an unknown entity is staging attacks on all the major presidential candidates, ensuring that the eventual winner is not "soft on zombies." When they uncover this plot, one of Kilburn’s guards attempts to kill them. Mat, Ash, and Ben are presumed to be infected and are declared legally dead. The CDC bombs their van. Mat is killed in the explosion and reanimates. Ash is forced to shoot them. Audrey arrives, revealing that she is a member of EIS. She arrests and tranquilizes Ash.

When Ash awakes, Audrey and Blackburn reveal the truth. Audrey is a former CDC agent. The CDC is manipulating the presidential election and killing reporters who come close to discovering its involvement. The CDC has stopped looking for a cure for Kellis-Amberlee, realizing that curing the disease would result in the agency losing its power. Kilburn orders the surviving bloggers to flee for their own safety. Audrey, Ben, Ash, and a security guard named Amber take an ATV and flee into the woods.

The group slowly makes their way towards Canada. They attempt to meet up with Dr. Shannon Abbey. Before they arrive, their vehicle is attacked by armed raiders. Amber is shot and killed. Ash is knocked unconscious. She awakens to find that she has been kidnapped by Clive, a gangster. (Note: See Please Do Not Taunt the Octopus.) Ash and her companions spend several weeks trapped in the Maze, a compound run by Clive. A physician named Jill, secretly working for Dr. Abbey, helps them escape. During their flight, Ash’s group learns of Georgia Mason’s death.

In an epilogue, Governor Kilburn loses the election. She commits suicide publicly, ensuring that the CDC will not attempt to leverage the bloggers against her. Ash, Ben, and Audrey escape to Canada, with plans to enter Ireland or Australia.

== Reception and awards ==
Kirkus Reviews gave the novel a starred review, calling it "a whip-smart thriller overflowing with sharp ideas and social commentary." The review noted that the book felt current despite being set in 2040.

Publishers Weekly wrote that the tone would be familiar to fans of the series, noting that the characters' voices were similar to those of the Masons, and that the conspiracy angle was not surprising. The review concluded that the novel's strengths included "the diverse cast, their deep ties to one another, and Grant's ability to surprise the reader with emotional gut punches."
