= The Fear (Higson novel) =

2011 novel by Charlie Higson

- First edition
- Author: Charlie Higson
- Language: English
- Series: The Enemy
- Genre: Horror, Young adult, Thriller
- Published: 15 September 2011 Puffin Books
- Publication place: United Kingdom
- Media type: Print (hardcover)
- ISBN: 978-0-14-138464-1
- OCLC: 373478708
- Preceded by: The Dead
- Followed by: The Sacrifice

The Fear is a post-apocalyptic young adult horror novel written by Charlie Higson. The book, released by Puffin Books in the UK on 15 September 2011 and by Disney Hyperion is the third book in a planned seven-book series, titled The Enemy. The Fear takes place in London, a year after a worldwide sickness has infected adults, turning them into something akin to voracious, cannibalistic zombies.

== Series ==
Puffin Books released the first novel in the series, titled The Enemy, in the UK on 3 September 2009; Disney Hyperion released it in the US on 11 May 2010. Puffin Books released the second novel in the series, titled The Dead, on 16 September 2010; the third novel, titled The Fear, on 15 September 2011; the fourth novel, The Sacrifice, on 20 September 2012; the fifth novel, The Fallen, on 12 September 2013; the sixth novel, The Hunted, on 4 September 2014; and the final book, The End, on 10 November 2015. Disney Hyperion released Higson's short story companion book in the series, titled Geeks vs. Zombies, on 5 June 2012; it portrays an exclusive scene from The Fear, on World Book Day.

== Summary ==
The Fear starts a few days before Small Sam and the Kid arrive at the Tower of London, at the end of The Dead, and another few days before the events of The Enemy (with both books merging near the middle). A prologue introduces a new zombie called "The Collector", a massive father who collects "toys" (kids), plays with them until they break (tortures them until they die), and eats them. He finds two children and adds them to his "collection", as described in the prologue of the book.

The real story begins at the Tower, where DogNut is growing restless of his confinement and is annoyed that he has been kicked from second in command by Ed. He plans on heading out to find Brooke and the others from the Tesco truck, whom they lost contact with during the fire of South London and the Battle of Lambeth Bridge. Although his intentions are to find everybody, he also has on Brooke. He discusses this with Ed (as seen in "The Dead") and they agree. DogNut assembles a team consisting of Courtney (who wants to find Brooke, but also secretly has a crush on DogNut), best friends Marco and Felix (who were with DogNut at the Imperial War Museum), Finn (who is looking for old friends), Al (who is looking for his sister Maria), youngster Olivia (who is looking for her older brother Paul) and Jessica (who has recently broken up with her boyfriend Brendan).

After a quick but difficult row upriver, they end up at the Houses of Parliament, where they find a girl named Nicola and her group. Nicola tells them none of their friends are at the Houses of Parliament, but lets them know about David taking residence at Buckingham Palace. The group decides to travel to the palace, thinking that their friends might be there. During the journey, the group is attacked by the 'gym bunnies', a group of zombies who, due to their good physical condition, are harder to kill; the gym bunnies corner DogNut's crew. About to go in for the kill, they are saved by a brutal group of hunters led by a boy named Ryan. Ryan's group guides DogNut's crew to the palace, where Al is reunited with Maria. David claims that he does not know where their friends are, but the group later realize he isn't all that he seems; mainly, he's lying about their friends, who are staying at the Natural History Museum. They head to the museum at night, without Al, who stays with his sister and Jessica, who is too scared to continue .

As night draws closer, zombies come out and chase the group to a house where they think kids are living, which is primarily due to Marco believing an arm sticking out of a container on a table (with an upright kids body next to it) was waving at them to come in. Instead, it turns out to be the Collector's lair, and the group encounter the large monster. They make a run for it, unaware that they've left Olivia behind. She kills herself before the Collector can get her by jumping off a high balcony to her death. The group later arrives at the Natural History Museum where they find Brooke and the others, and meet Robbie (their Head of Security), Justin (the leader), and Paul (Olivia's brother). Paul asks for Olivia, but Courtney explains that Olivia was killed by the Collector. Paul goes hysterical after learning about Olivia's death, and he becomes determined to kill the Collector. DogNut's group, Robbie, Jackson (a friend of Robbie's), Ryan's hunters, and several others from the museum all join with Paul to kill the Collector. The large group coaxes the Collector out of his lair onto the road, where they savagely beat him to death. Jackson, one of the girls from Ryan's group, ultimately finishes the job by stabbing a spear through the Collector's neck.

Upon returning, Justin gives DogNut a tour of the place. He shows DogNut the experiments to find a cure - which included taking samples from three zombies they've locked up in the Tesco lorry. Justin tells DogNut about the large number of zombies in the museum's basement, where the group obtains their test subjects. They have found out so far that UV light (sunlight) rapidly increases the speed of the disease, causing a sicko to die if exposed to too much sunlight. However, they've also found that sickos can build up a resistance to sunlight, through exposure to a fixed amount of sunlight each day until they are fully able to roam about in the daytime. Afterwards, Paul loses his mind and starts to threaten and blame everyone for Olivia's death. Brooke eventually calms him down, and DogNut decides to head back to the Tower first thing the following morning but is persuaded by Justin to stay longer, to write his and his group's story into a book which a bookworm named Chris (previously and originally starring in "The Dead") is writing in the library. During a chat where DogNut flirts with Brooke, she reveals that Courtney likes him (much to his surprise). DogNut talks to Courtney about this, where she explains that she thinks Brooke still has a crush on Ed, and when they return to the Tower with them, Brooke will start a romance with him. DogNut listens to Courtney and remembers what she says.

At the Palace, David and Nicola meet in secret. David proposes that the two groups form an alliance - a step toward implementing his maniacal plan to take over the entirety of London. Nicola is reluctant but ends up creating a deal that involves removing the 'squatters' at St James's Park, as they pose a threat to her group at the House of Parliament. Until then, she won't officially agree to the alliance. David accepts and immediately asks Jester to go and recruit children who can fight (which reveals this to be Jester's actual mission when he is found by the Holloway kids in "The Enemy"). David also has a crush on Nicola, which she teases him about until they are interrupted.

A loner named Shadowman (who has been spying on the Squatters) visits Jester in Buckingham Palace and is convinced to join the expedition to recruit fighters for the Palace. They are joined by a couple named Tom and Kate, and a boy named Alfie. Jester is initially mad of the small group that they have, and said that David only sent them "bloody civilians". The small group begin walking north until they encounter a group of zombies. They flee the zombies and end up at King's Cross Station. They fight off some zombies before Jester accidentally hits Shadowman, leaving him with a slight concussion. Jester, Alfie, Tom, and Kate abandon Shadowman, and then split into two groups with Jester and Alfie in one, and Tom and Kate in the other. Shadowman passes out, and wakes up to a huge pain in the head, and to one of the remaining grownups attempting to devour him. As the grownup cannot walk (due to broken spine) and Shadowman passes out upon standing up and at random intervals, a "nightmare version of hare and tortoise" occurs, in which the faster Shadowman crawls away from the slower grownup, but then passes out randomly, allowing the slower grownup to catch him. Finally, in a latch ditch effort, Shadowman kills the grownup using a steel rod he finds in a pile of scrap metal. He then succumbs in to his pain and tiredness, and passes out to a fight taking place between other grownups and a stronger group that takes him.

Jester and Alfie find refuge in a flat until a group of zombies find them and attempt to break in. In creating a plan of escape, Jester tricks Alfie and abandons him, escaping by himself. Alfie is then killed by the grownups after he finds out Jester ran away. His fingers gets cut off by the window where he jumps off (not explicitly stated, but most likely by the window falling down upon him, or less likely by the axe, which as mentioned earlier, by a grownup) where he then painfully stumbles into his fate. Jester runs and discovers the Morrison's supermarket but is denied entry. He then finds the Waitrose supermarket, where he is rescued by Arran's group (described in The Enemy) and convinces them to come to the palace.

Shadowman awakens and finds himself at the Emirates Stadium, being watched by Saint George's "Lieutenants" (who he nicknames Spike, Man-U, One-Armed Bandit, and Bluetooth). He learns that St. George is much smarter than the rest of the zombies, and he is creating an army in the stadium. Shadowman escapes the army of zombies when the fire lights up in the stands (most likely as part of Small Sam's escape, as told in The Enemy). Shadowman takes refuge in an apartment building where he discovers boxes of weapons and food. He sees this as a sign to follow St. George's army and to learn about them before returning to London city. While watching their movement, he sees Tom and Kate being pulled out of a house they had taken shelter in, and they get killed by St. George's army. Dozing off to sleep, Shadowman is suddenly awakened by a group of zombies that have found his hiding spot, including One-Armed Bandit. He manages to kill them all and plans to slaughter every single one of St. George's remaining right-hand men, St. George himself, and Jester (for leaving him behind).

Meanwhile, DogNut, Courtney, Marco, and Felix are still at the museum, preparing to head back to the Tower. In a sudden surge of happiness, DogNut kisses Courtney. Finn decides to stay at the museum, whilst Brooke joins the group and prepares to head back to the tower. Robbie and Jackson join the group to escort them part of the way. They set off toward the Tower and are ambushed by the 'gym bunnies' again. DogNut, Courtney, Marco, and Felix are all killed whilst Jackson escapes with a wounded Robbie, and Brooke is saved by the Holloway kids (as described in The Enemy). She is taken to Buckingham Palace with the Holloway crew and is revealed that she is the bandaged girl in the sickbay. Jester and David both fail to recognize her due to her injuries, and as in The Enemy, Brooke wakes up and tells Maxie and Blue that David is a liar.

Meanwhile, Paul, who is still crazed, secretly leaves the museum for Buckingham Palace. He meets with David and Jester, who take advantage of his mental state and tell him a fake story that everyone at the museum was plotting against him. This causes Paul to want to take revenge on everyone who believes he killed Olivia, and David convinces him to return to the museum and release all the zombies who are in the basement. Paul agrees and returns to the museum.

Whilst Brooke and the Holloway children escape the palace (As shown in "The Enemy"), Paul kills a boy named Jamie and releases the zombies underneath the museum (revealing that he has been infected by a zombie bite all along), and Shadowman watches as Saint George's army kills Callum, burns Waitrose to the ground and marches on to the heart of the city (as seen in "The Enemy"), finally deciding to name them "The Fear".

== Characters ==
=== The Tower of London ===
- Al - Part of the Tower crew. Carries a mace.
- Courtney - Part of the Tower crew. She has a love interest in DogNut.
- DogNut - The captain of the Tower of London group sets out to find Brooke.
- Ed Carter - Captain of the Tower Guard at the Tower of London.
- Felix - Part of the Tower crew, and one of the boys who originally came from the Imperial War Museum.
- Finn - Part of the Tower crew.
- Jessica - Part of the Tower crew.
- Jordan Hordern - Leader of the group at the Tower of London.
- Kyle - Ed's right-hand man at the Tower, he appears in DogNut's nightmare-memory at the beginning, helping Ed save DogNut from sickos but fails to save Leo.
- Leo - A determined but clumsy boy who died prior to the events of the book, but whom DogNut dreams about every night, as he blames himself for Leo's death.
- Marco - Part of the Tower crew, who originally came from the Imperial War Museum.
- Olivia Channing - Part of the Tower crew.

=== The Natural History Museum ===
- Brooke - After the events of The Dead, she lives at the Natural History Museum, wears an old-fashioned dress, and no longer bleaches her hair blond. She tells DogNut about Courtney's feelings for him, which he cannot see. She later leaves with DogNut's crew for the Tower. Afterward, she survives the final battle with 'gym bunnies', as she is saved by the Holloway crew. She tells Maxie and Blue about the museum.
- Chris Marker - Once unable to stop reading. He has now grown a beard, and lives in the library, and records the stories of how the kids at the museum and DogNut's crew survived, calling it "The Chronicles of Survival". He is less obsessed with reading now.
- Einstein - A handsome boy with brown teeth, who works in the labs at the museum on a cure. He doesn't seem to like DogNut too much. His real name is Orlando Epstein.
- Jackson - A strong girl fighter at the museum, with a face like a potato. She is the one who finishes off the Collector. Later, she helps get Robbie back to the museum after he is injured. She is thirteen years old.
- Jamie - A boy who Paul Channing strangles in the basement before letting the sickos in. After incapacitating him, Paul lets the sickos in, who proceed to eat Jamie. As he dies, Paul shows him that he is bitten. He is thirteen, and was friendly to Paul at the beginning.
- Justin - Leader at the Natural History Museum. Formerly in charge of driving the Tesco truck, which is now used to house sickos. He is leading the search for a cure. He realizes that DogNut is on the expedition to gain fame and possibly take over the Natural History Museum. He is fifteen years old.
- Paul Channing - Olivia's brother. At the museum, he is in charge of cleaning after the sickos on the truck. He doesn't take his sister's death very well and loses his mind after they kill the sicko responsible, the Collector. He releases the sickos in the basement of the museum, seeking revenge, after David takes advantage of his mental state to manipulate him to do so. It is revealed that he was bitten by the sicko in the lorry. He is fifteen years old, and very thin, with limbs like a spider. He commonly wears a black turtleneck.
- Robbie - Head of security at the museum. He is saved by Jackson but is seriously injured from the final battle with the 'gym bunnies'.

=== Buckingham Palace ===
- Alfie Walker - Part of Jester's crew. He is killed after Jester abandons him. He is thirteen, short, carries a spear and enjoys singing. He seems more determined than Tom and Kate, but is also slower and less of a fighter.
- Andy Thomas - A red-coated guard with fair hair and a big nose. He is bored with his job, but prefers it to the blandness of gardening, and is nice when compared to other guards at the palace. He informs DogNut of the way over the wall when pressured to. He is revealed to be the "Big Nose" who escapes with the Holloway crew when Brooke mentions him as one of the guards guarding the infirmary.
- David King - A power-mad teenager. He is the leader of the Buckingham Palace group and plans to restore law and order in London, with him in charge. He has a love interest in Nicola, who seems to realize this. He is 15 years old.
- Jester - David King's right-hand man. He is the leader of the small group which finds fighters to deal with the squatters. He is a coward who abandons those who look up to him to save himself, while convincing himself it was the only thing he could do. He wears a patchwork coat to memorialize all those he has lost.
- Jonathan - A young cadet who is training to be a guard at the palace. He informs David and Jester that the royals have escaped.
- Kate - Part of Jester's crew. Tom's girlfriend, who is fourteen or fifteen, carries a sword and constantly complains. She, like her boyfriend, expresses a desire to go back to the palace that same night. After a battle with adults in which Jester gives Shadowman a concussion, she and Tom abandon the rest of their crew and hole up in a house. Saint George and his crew later find them, and attack them. When they are carried out of the house, she is barely alive, and is killed when Saint George and his crew eat her. Shadowman witnesses their deaths.
- Maria - A cook at the palace, Al's younger sister, and Pod's girlfriend. She did not know of her brother's whereabouts, and is overjoyed to be reunited with him. She later tells them where Brooke is, after David claims he doesn't know. She knows because Pod tells her certain things he shouldn't in an attempt to impress her. Al stays at the palace to be close to her.
- Pod - Head of security at the palace. He is not very intelligent, and David knows this, and considers him one who will easily follow orders.
- Rose - Head doctor at the palace. She is considered a professional, by kid standards. She is instructed by David to keep the Holloway kids away from Brooke (who he does not recognize).
- Shadowman - A boy who spies on settlements throughout London. He and Jester know each other from before the virus, and have been close friends for a while. He becomes part of Jester's crew but is soon abandoned by Jester after he is accidentally given a concussion (by Jester). He starts to follow St George to learn about his zombie army. His real name is Dylan Peake.
- Tom - Part of Jester's crew. Kate's boyfriend, who is fourteen or fifteen, carries a sword and constantly complains. He, like his girlfriend, expresses a desire to go back to the palace that same night. After a battle with adults in which Jester gives Shadowman a concussion, he and Kate abandon the rest of their crew and hole up in a house. Saint George and his crew later find them, and attack them. When they are carried out of the house to be eaten, he is already dead. Shadowman witnesses their deaths.

=== Houses of Parliament ===
- Bozo - A boy on guard duty outside Parliament. He wears a policeman's helmet, and considers himself to be stupid.
- Nicola - A girl who is the Prime Minister staying at the House of Parliament. She tells David about the squatters' raids against her base and strikes a deal with David that if he removes the squatters, she will form an alliance with him. David has a crush on her, which amuses her.
- Ponytail - A boy from Parliament who is bald, except for a ponytail, has some hair above his lip, and missing his front teeth. He appears to be Nicola's second-in-command, and came over Lambeth Bridge at the same time as the Tesco truck.

=== Squatters ===
- Carl - A pirate-looking boy who is Just John's second in command. He prefers to take orders from John than have his own authority.
- Just John - The leader of the squatters in St James Park. He seems to be mentally unstable.
- Paddy - A boy in Just John's camp whom Shadowman befriends. He enjoys playing with Halo action figures.

=== Other kids ===
- Blue - A character from The Enemy, he is noticed by Brooke, held captive in the infirmary at Buckingham Palace.
- Maxie - A character from The Enemy, she is noticed by Brooke, held captive in the infirmary at Buckingham Palace.
- Ryan Aherne - The brutal leader of the hunters who cuts off the ears of adults and wears them as trophies. He has acne, and wears a mask which is the face of an adult he killed. He looks to be sixteen years old.

=== Adults ===
- Bluetooth - A father in a business suit with a Bluetooth earpiece in his ear, and one of Saint George's lieutenants. He is more intelligent than most adults, though not on the level of Saint George.
- The Collector - A very large fat man who, without his beard, might be mistaken for a woman. He believes children are toys, and collects them and other things regularly. He is intelligent, even for a sicko, and capable of speech (though can only say one or two words at a time). He spends his days sleeping in an apartment basement, having knocked out the walls separating his apartment from neighboring apartments, and goes out at night, collecting anything. He is encountered by DogNut's crew after they leave Buckingham Palace, and eats Olivia's body after she commits suicide. The group later returns with some kids from the museum, as well as Ryan's hunters, and kills him.
- Man U - A father in a Manchester United T-shirt, and one of Saint George's lieutenants. He is more intelligent than most adults, though not on the level of Saint George.
- Mother with Sunglasses - A mother with sunglasses to resist the sun, and the leader of the 'gym bunnies'. She is first seen wearing jogging pants and she wears her hair in a crude, pulled back ponytail. On her wrist is a Celtic knot tattoo. She is more intelligent than most adults, even able to remember that she at one point had children and is able to wield a knife. She scars Felix and Brooke during the battle, but as she is about to kill Brooke, the only survivor, she is shot in the back of the head with an arrow (presumably by Sophie).
- One-Armed Bandit - A shirtless father with one arm missing, and one of Saint George's lieutenants. He is more intelligent than most adults, though not on the level of Saint George. He uses a rock as a weapon. At the end, he and a group of adults find Shadowman's hiding place and attack him, but Shadowman, despite still being slightly concussed, kills all of them, including the One-Armed Bandit.
- Saint George - The sicko in the Saint George shirt who was previously known as Greg Thorne. He is introduced in the second book. He is far more intelligent than most infected adults, even to the extent of being able to remember some words and recall some memories, and to plan. In the middle of the book, he is revealed to still be able to remember his son, Liam (though does not remember killing him) and that they used to enjoy soccer.
- Spike - A father, and one of Saint George's lieutenants. He is more intelligent than most adults, though not on the level of Saint George. He is at first called "Mr. Ordinary" because he has no marks by which Shadowman can give him a nickname. Later, Shadowman shoots him in the shoulder with a crossbow bolt while he and the crew are eating Tom and Kate. After this, Shadowman weeps with joy at having found a nickname for him.
