= The Enemy (Higson novel) =

2009 novel by Charlie Higson

- First edition
- Author: Charlie Higson
- Original title: English
- Language: English
- Series: The Enemy
- Genre: Horror, Young adult, Thriller, Adventure
- Publisher: Puffin Books (UK), Disney Hyperion (US)
- Publication date: 2 September 2009 (UK), 2010 (US)
- Publication place: United Kingdom
- Media type: Print (Hardcover)
- Pages: 440
- ISBN: 978-0-14-138464-1
- OCLC: 373478708
- Followed by: The Dead

The Enemy is a post-apocalyptic young adult horror novel written by Charlie Higson. The book takes place in London, United Kingdom, after a worldwide sickness has infected adults, turning them into something akin to voracious, cannibalistic zombies. Puffin Books released The Enemy in the UK on 3 September 2009, Disney Hyperion in the US on 11 May 2010.

The Enemy is the first book in a planned series of seven. Puffin Books released the second novel in the series, titled The Dead, on 16 September 2010; the third novel, titled The Fear, on 15 September 2011; the fourth novel, The Sacrifice, on the 20 September 2012; the fifth novel, The Fallen, on 12 September 2013; the sixth novel, The Hunted, on 4 September 2014; and the final book, The End, on 10 November 2015. Disney Hyperion released Higson's short story companion book in the series, titled Geeks vs. Zombies, on 5 June 2012; it portrays an exclusive scene from The Fear, set on World Book Day.

== Summary ==
=== Original, British publication ===
In Holloway, North London, one year after a mystery disease has turned anyone over fourteen and fifteen into cannibalistic, zombie-like creatures, the surviving children have formed a number of groups to better survive and combat the threat. A group in a local Waitrose supermarket, led by a boy named Arran and his second-in-command, a girl named Maxie, grows increasingly frustrated as children are kidnapped and killed by infected adults, who are becoming smarter. A scavenger party, composed of Arran, a short-fused fighter named Achilleus, a slingshot marksman named Ollie, and best friends Freak and Deke, becomes trapped by infected adults while exploring a building. During the ensuing fight, Deke is killed when his lung is punctured by a shard of glass, and Arran is bitten by a zombie he believes to be his mother. The bite sickens him, and the group barely escapes. Achilleus blames Deke's death on Freak (as it was his idea to search the building), sending Freak into depression.

Later that night, they save a boy named Jester from a large pack of zombies, prompting him to invite the group to his home, Buckingham Palace, which he claims is safe. The majority of the group likes the idea and set off to the palace through Camden, along with another group of kids from a nearby Morrisons supermarket, led by Blue and his second-in-command Whitney. A loner named Callum stays behind on his own, afraid to leave the confines of his base.

Meanwhile, Small Sam, a young boy who was kidnapped earlier by adults (leading the rest of the Waitrose group to believe he is dead), awakens in a zombie nesting ground at Emirates Stadium. He escapes the stadium by setting it on fire, along the way encountering a father wearing a Saint George T-shirt, who is in control of the rest of the stadium zombies. Sam flees to Waitrose, where Callum explains that the other children left for Buckingham Palace. He is unable to catch up with them, eventually heading down into the London Underground where he is swarmed by a group of zombies. He is saved by an apparently uninfected man named Nick, who takes him to the carriage which he and his also-uninfected wife Rachel are using as a home. Due to exhaustion, Sam eventually falls asleep.

As they are making their way to the palace, the Waitrose and Morrisons children (now called the Holloway kids after the road both shops were on) are met by a large army of zombies, led by the Saint George zombie Sam saw earlier. In the resulting fight, Arran and Maxie discover they are attracted to each other, a secret they both kept for fear of the other person not feeling the same way. The Holloway children eventually force the zombie army into a retreat, but Arran's bite causes him to go insane and chase after them. He is mistaken for a zombie by a girl named Sophie (leader of a group of archers) and she shoots him in the chest with a bow and arrow. Despite her attempts to save him, Arran eventually dies in Maxie's arms.

Meanwhile, Sam wakes up inside a different carriage, chained to the wall with a group of other children. Nick enters and reveals that although he and Rachel are apparently not infected, they are still cannibals, and intent on eating Sam. When he leaves, another small child (who simply refers to himself as "The Kid") enters the carriage via a window and helps Sam escape, along with another girl named Rhiannon (the rest believe Nick wants to help them and stay behind to be devoured). They are chased by Nick through the Underground, during which Rhiannon is shot, until they end up outside and Nick corners Sam underneath a carriage. Just as he is about to kill Sam, the sun comes out, and Nick (who is revealed to be infected along with Rachel) rapidly accelerates in infection due to the amount of time he has spent in the Underground. He eventually swells and bursts, which kills him instantly. Sam and the Kid escape into the streets, developing a friendship in the process.

Whilst the Holloway children continue on to the palace, Maxie, now the leader of the Waitrose group, develops a hatred for Sophie (who has decided to join them along with her group), blaming her for Arran's death. She struggles under the pressure of having responsibility for every kid in her group. Blue attempts to help her before the group is ambushed by a pack of infected chimpanzees that have escaped a nearby zoo. They kill many small children, as well as Maxie's newly appointed right-hand man Josh, devastating her. They also encounter a small group of kids being attacked by extremely strong zombies, and fail to save all but one of them, an unnamed girl who is bandaged and taken along with them.

The Holloway children eventually arrive at the palace, and are greeted by the leader of Jester's group, David. The bandaged girl is put in the infirmary, whilst the rest of the group are given a tour of the palace, where they are shown the infected royal family (who are kept in the throne room, too weak to fight back). A feast is held to celebrate their arrival, whilst a suspicious Ollie goes off to search the palace by himself. He eventually discovers that the rich food and activities at the palace are all just an act to get them to stay there. He neglects to inform the rest of the group, fearing it would cause more trouble. David eventually informs them that they are having trouble with a group of crazed children over in St. James's Park (nicknamed "Squatters"). He explains that they have been trying to expand their garden and plant food in the park, only for the Squatters to either steal or destroy it. He wants the Holloway children to go over and try to reason with the Squatters' leader, Just John, and try and make peace.

The next day, the Holloway children head over to the park to speak with John, whilst Freak stays behind out of depression. They attempt to negotiate with the Squatters, but Achilleus ends up starting a large fight between the two groups instead. In the battle, Blue gets a shed collapsed on his head, whilst Maxie singlehandedly fights John. Just as John is about to kill her, Freak (who heard the commotion and entered the park) intervenes and is stabbed in the back in Maxie's place, killing him. Out of fury, Maxie punches John and knocks him unconscious, ending the battle. Back at the palace, David declares that due to the casualties, the ownership of the park will be decided in a fight to the death between Achilleus and John. If Achilleus wins, the Palace group will get control over the park and use it as farmland. If John wins, he will get to keep the park, as well as the freedom to take any resources needed from the palace.

Maxie and Blue begin to have second thoughts about David, and before the fight Sophie tells Maxie that she is leaving the palace due to the guilt of Arran's death. In the fight, John gets the upper hand and severely damages Achilleus's ear, before Achilleus wins and pins him in a death position. Instead of choosing to kill John, Achilleus humiliates him by kissing him on the lips (implying to the reader that he is gay). Amazed by Achilleus's fighting skills, a young Irish Squatter named Paddy asks him to take him on as an apprentice, which Achilleus agrees. The palace group gets control over the park, but David locks Maxie inside the infirmary with Blue, revealing he intends on taking over their groups to use as his army.

Inside the infirmary, Maxie talks with Blue, where he unintentionally reveals he has a crush on her. They are interrupted by the bandaged girl, who tells them that David is a liar. She explains that David confined her to the infirmary in case she had met him before (which she had) and reveals to them what sort of person he is. They are freed by Ollie, who has gathered up support to escape the palace. They free the royals, causing chaos, and fight their way through David's forces, eventually making it out (with Paddy and a guard known as Big Nose coming along with them). The bandaged girl reveals she comes from a group of children staying at the National History Museum, and that they would be happy to let the group stay. Maxie and Blue agree with her, and they set off towards the museum.

Meanwhile, Sam and the Kid have gotten lost in the streets, becoming exhausted and nearly passing out. They are met by a group of people led by a boy with a scarred face, later known as Ed, who take them back to their home in the Tower of London. Callum, who has become depressed from loneliness since his friends left for the palace. Eventually, the same army from before (led by Saint George) storm the Waitrose supermarket, and Callum lets them kill him to end his suffering. They set the supermarket on fire and burn it to the ground, with Saint George leading his army into the centre of town. In his mind, he says that he intends to kill and devour every single child in the city, stating that "He is Saint George. The city belongs to Him".

=== U.S. publication ===
Disney Hyperion, the series' American publisher, wanted to target the books at a slightly older audience. Consequently, for this publisher's series, the cutoff age for infection was raised from 14 to 16, and some of the characters were aged up accordingly. Additionally, some of the cultural references and terminology unique to the United Kingdom were changed to ones that American readers were more likely to understand.

== Characters ==
=== Waitrose group ===
- Arran Harper – The charismatic and intelligent first leader of the Waitrose group, and the novel's false protagonist. He is bitten by a zombified woman whom he believes was his mother and, soon afterwards, is shot by an arrow from Sophie's bow. He has feelings for Maxie, but, as he dies, he is unable to follow up on those feelings.
- Achilleus ("Akkie") – The strongest fighter in the Waitrose group. He can be aggressive, and has a sense of humour, but his fighting skills make him a valuable member of the group. He blames Freak for the incident at the swimming pool that cost Deke's life and Arran an injury. He fights a kid called John and once he beats him he kisses John implying he is gay. After his fight, a younger boy, named Patrick asks to be his caddy and he accepts. He, too, makes it out of David's rule of the palace.
- Ben – One of the Waitrose group, an emo, and Bernie's best friend. Greatly interested in engineering, he and Bernie (known as "the twins") set up the defense system around the Waitrose. When they arrive at Buckingham Palace, they try to make plans for heating and such, but David disregards them. At the end of the novel, the twins are among those who escape David's rule of the Palace.
- Bernie – One of the Waitrose group, an emo who's responsible for many of the group's engineering feats, and Ben's best friend (see above).
- Callum – A Waitrose boy who refuses to leave with the other Waitrose children. He survives on his own for a while, but eventually succumbs to bitter loneliness and allow the adults to kill him after they break into the store. His head is later placed on a pole carried by the adults who killed him.
- Curly Sam – A small, curly-haired kid in the Waitrose group, who acts like a know-it-all. He is killed during the attack in Regent's Park.
- Deke – A boy in the Waitrose group. He is Freak's best friend and, before the epidemic, always hung around with him. During the swimming pool episode, Deke dies after suffering a punctured lung from broken vending machine glass, and grown-ups take him away to eat him.
- Ella – A young girl in the Waitrose group, who constantly misses her brother, Small Sam. She, along with Blu-Tack Bill and Monkey Boy, take over caring for Godzilla after the death of Joel.
- Freak – A boy in the Waitrose group. He is Deke's best friend and, before the epidemic, always hung around with him. Well liked by most of the kids, he becomes one of Maxie's closest friends, but he struggles to get on with Achilleus, who blames Freak for the deaths of Arran and Deke in the swimming pool episode. "Just John" fatally stabs Freak as Freak saves Maxie. His real name is David.
- Josh – A boy in the Waitrose group. After Achilleus, Josh is the second-best fighter of the group and claims he isn't scared of anything. He is killed by infected monkeys.
- Katey – A young girl in the Waitrose group. She is killed during the attack in Regent's Park.
- Louise – A young girl in the Waitrose group. She is killed during the attack in Regent's Park.
- Maeve – A girl with medical knowledge, who is in the Waitrose group; she is friendly towards Maxie and is one of those who escapes David's rule.
- Maxie – A feisty and independent girl in the Waitrose group; one of the novel's main characters. After Arran dies, Maxie, who had been his second in command, takes leadership of the Waitrose group, but her memory of Arran keeps her from staying mentally strong. She overcomes this and becomes a good leader after Ollie privately tells her he believes the Waitrose kids need a leader to look up to, to make hard decisions, and to ensure the Waitrose group does not become "second class citizens" to the Morrisons and Buckingham Palace groups. He tells her that she can be perfect for this role. At the end of the novel, she is among those who escape David's rule of the Palace.
- Monkey Boy – A little kid nicknamed 'Monkey Boy' for his fondness for climbing things. He, along with Ella and Blu-Tack Bill, takes over caring for Godzilla after the death of Joel.
- Ollie – A boy in the Waitrose group and a central character in the novel. Ollie is red-haired, a skirmisher, sharp, and quick-witted; he is, generally, the brains of the group. He says that he lost his little brother during a riot and wants to stay alive as the last member of his family. At the end of the novel, he is among those who escape David's rule of the Palace.
- Small Sam – A surprisingly brave nine-year-old boy in the Waitrose group, Ella's brother, and a main character in the novel. Early on, he becomes separated from the group after being kidnapped by adults. He escapes and discovers adults who do not seem too affected by the disease, but still eat children. Again, he escapes and meets a new group of children at the Tower of London. He is most likely the main character of the series.

=== Morrisons group ===
- Alice – A little girl who plays with Godzilla after Joel is killed. Escapes David's rule with the rest of the kids.
- Big Mick – A fighter in the Morrisons group. He is shown in the background several times throughout the journey to Buckingham Palace. He, in the end, is among those to escape David's rule.
- Blue – The leader of the Morrisons group and one of the novel's main characters. He explains to Maxie that he was once a bookworm, fat, and not so good with fighting. But after the disease started to affect the adults, and the early kids had all been killed off by the grown-ups, Blue had to learn to fight, and he became a very strong leader. He tells Maxie he likes her but is worried by her feelings for Arran.
- Blu-Tack Bill – A young boy from Morrisons who never speaks, apparently traumatized by the deaths of his parents. He is always seen playing with putty, which is stated to be the only thing that makes him happy. He is shown to be extremely quick to count, only taking seconds to count large amounts. He, along with Ella and Monkey Boy, takes over caring for Godzilla after Joel's death.
- Joel – A little boy who carries around a puppy called Godzilla. He is killed during an attack in Regent's Park.
- Lewis – A boy in the Morrisons group and one of its best fighters. Lewis has an afro and always looks sleepy, but he has surprisingly fast reflexes. During the journey of the combined Waitrose-Morrisons group to Buckingham Palace, he commanded the left flank and becomes a supporting character towards the end of the novel, striking up a friendship with Achilleus. He escapes the palace in the end.
- Whitney – The Morrisons group's second-in-command and a central character in the novel. After the Morrisons and Waitrose groups merge, Whitney strikes up a good friendship with Maxie. Whitney, in the end, also escapes David's rule.

=== Buckingham Palace group ===
- Andy Thomas ("Big Nose") – A guard at the palace. He carries a gun, and at one point guards the door to the infirmary where Maxie and Blue are held captive. He seems doubtful that David will manage to take over London and would rather be a farmer than a guard. After Achilleus and Lewis free Maxie and Blue, Big Nose begs to be taken with them when they leave, as he has had enough of David's crap and knows he will be punished if he stays. They oblige, and he is among those to escape the palace, though he is apparently not sure he made the right choice. He is described as fair-haired and slightly shorter than Spotty.
- David King – The leader of the Buckingham Palace group. He is an arrogant, psychopathic and megalomaniacal teenager who attempts to restore the British monarchy under his personal control. He is pale skinned, has a lot of freckles, and looks to be 17 years old. He is extravagant and vain, and dresses excessively in a black suit. Jester claims he is sixteen.
- Franny – David's head farmer at the palace. She works hard. She wears glasses and overalls, and seems to have feelings for David.
- Jester – David's right-hand man in the Buckingham Palace group. He walks to meet the Waitrose and Morrisons groups, and persuades them to undertake the trek to the Palace, where he says life is. He wears a patchwork coat to memorialize all those he has lost. Despite this apparent honour, he is insensitive, snobby, and condescending. He is also shown to be a coward several times throughout the book, fleeing danger whenever possible and trying to make alliances with both Achilleus and Just John before their fight so he can be in the winner's graces. He has stiff, matted hair and looks sixteen.
- Pod – David's head of security at the palace. Described as blond and good looking. He played rugby before the infection.
- Rose – The head doctor at the palace. She is loyal to David, but seems to feel guilty about imprisoning Maxie and Blue. According to Jester, she was originally from his group and came to the palace with him and others.
- Spotty – A guard at the palace. He carries a gun and at one point guards the door to the infirmary where Maxie and Blue are being held captive. He seems to believe his position is great and will be rewarded after David takes over London, which he firmly believes will happen. He is slightly taller than Big Nose, and has short, curly brown hair and an infestation of acne.

=== Squatters ===
- Carl – One of the squatters in the park. He looks like a pirate and seems to be "Just John"'s second in command. He is slightly taller and slightly older than "Just John".
- "Just John" – The leader of the squatters in the park. He is nearly killed by Achilleus, and he and his group are cast out of the park. He, like Achilleus, has designs shaved into his head.
- Paddy the Caddy – An Irish boy, whose real name is Patrick, who is originally part of "Just John"'s group at the park. He admires Achilleus after Achilleus' fight with "Just John", and Achilleus makes Paddy his apprentice; Achilleus also makes Paddy carry all of Achilleus' weapons in a golf club bag. In the end, Paddy is among those to escape the palace.

=== Adults ===
- Nick – A tall, dreadlock-wearing man who has avoided the virus by hiding in the underground with his wife, Rachel. They have survived by scavenging, but still eat children. To get children, they kidnap those they find in the underground, fatten them up, and eat them eventually, restraining them "for their own safety". They eventually find Small Sam and keep him restrained with the others to be eaten. The Kid frees Sam, and Nick pursues them out of the underground into the sunlight, where the virus kills him after he nearly kills them.
- Rachel – Nick's wife, who has avoided the virus by hiding in the underground with him. She helps him secure children and eat them. She is described as somewhat plump.
- Saint George – The zombie in the St. George's Cross vest. He is far more intelligent than most infected adults, even to the extent of remembering some words, and retaining some memories and some ability to plan for the future. Toward the end of the novel, Saint George creates a plan to hunt down and devour all children. He serves as the main antagonist and Bigger Bad of the book.

=== Other characters ===
- Brooke – A girl from the National History Museum who is traveling with her friends when they are all attacked by a group of grown-ups. She is initially saved by the Holloway Crew and taken to Buckingham Palace, where she is held captive until Maxie and Blue rescue her at the end of the novel. She is unnamed in The Enemy, and her identity is not revealed until the end of The Fear.
- Claire – A little girl who is held captive by Nick and Rachel. She is well fed, but feeble, and spends most of her time sleeping. When The Kid tries to free her, she does not go with him and remains in captivity, not realizing what Nick and Rachel are.
- Ed Carter – The second-in-command at the Tower of London and the leader of the party who rescues Sam and the Kid. Like Brooke, Ed's role in The Enemy is minimal, but he plays a larger role in the forthcoming books starting with The Dead.
- Godzilla – A puppy carried and cared for by Joel, a member of the Morrisons group. After Joel's death, Godzilla mourns him. He is then cared for by Ella, Monkey Boy and Blu-Tack Bill, who take him with them when they escape the palace.
- Jason – Claire's twin brother, held captive by Nick and Rachel. When The Kid tries to free him, he does not go with him, remaining behind in captivity with his sister. He is well fed, but feeble, yet seems more active than his sister.
- The Kid – An eccentric nine-year-old boy who saves Small Sam from Nick and Rachel.
- Orion – A ginger cat belonging to Nick and Rachel. Rhiannon and Small Sam think he is ugly. When some of the kids try to escape, they run into Orion, and he hisses in surprise, alerting Nick and Rachel to the escape.
- Rhiannon – A girl Small Sam's age, held captive by Nick and Rachel. She has a chest infection, which is why she has not been eaten yet. When The Kid comes to free them, she leaves with him and Sam. However, her chest infection makes it hard for her to keep up, forcing them to drag her. She gets worse as they run on after the adults discover their escape, and she eventually is left behind on an escalator, after Nick shoots her. She slows Nick down by tripping him, to allow Small Sam and The Kid time to escape. After Nick's death, Sam suggests going back for her, but approaching adults force them to leave. Her ultimate fate is not resolved. She is described as fat, but with skinny legs. She is older than Sam.
- Sophie – A girl from another group which merges with the combined Waitrose-Morrisons group on its way to Buckingham Palace. Sophie accidentally shoots the already-wounded Arran with an arrow, killing him. She leaves the palace during the fight between Achilleus and "Just John".
