= Zombies: A Record of the Year of Infection =

Book by Don Roff

- Author: Don Roff
- Cover artist: Chris Lane
- Language: English
- Genre: Horror novel
- Publisher: Simon & Schuster
- Publication date: September 2009
- Publication place: United States
- Media type: Print Paperback
- Pages: 144pp
- ISBN: 978-0-8118-7100-6

Zombies: A Record of the Year of Infection is a 2009 apocalyptic horror illustrated novel written by Don Roff and illustrated by Chris Lane. The cover indicates the book is a compilation of the field notes of Dr. Robert Twombly, a survivor of a wave of untraceable infections that sweep the world turning the dead into zombies. The book is written as a journal of the protagonist, forward dated to 2012.

== Plot ==
A short prologue explains that the story, notes and images were those of Dr. Robert Twombly and were found in a remote cabin in the township of Churchill, Manitoba. The notes detail an individual account of survival and escape after a mass-scale (presumably global) zombie outbreak, referred to as a 'Necrotic Infection', beginning around January 7, 2012, and lasting for approximately one year. The purported importance of the journal comes from both Twombly's artistry and his medical knowledge, which permitted him to document the zombie outbreak with a unique level of detail and candor.

The author extensively utilizes a false document technique, mixing diary-style first person stream of consciousness narration, drawn and painted images detailing the world following an undead pandemic, as well as brief glimpses of 'found' objects such as newspaper clippings and official reports to generate the central narrative.

Dr. Twombly, a haematology and oncology specialist in Seattle, Washington keeps a journal detailing events from January 5 until March 28, 2012. At first the diary appears to be used for sketches of birds, but an entry on January 12 describes a pandemic of unknown cause overwhelming the entire city and much of the world beyond. Before the internet shut down, headlines referring to a sudden, critical infection affecting thousands worldwide show the scale of the unfolding catastrophe, destroying commerce and limiting travel. His office is beleaguered by thousands, all showing identical symptoms of an unknown, seemingly undetectable pathogen. As the sick begin to die they quickly reanimate, walking slowly, attempting to devour those around them still alive, and – to varying extents – exhibiting some behavior of their previous existences (one bashes a vending machine as he did when he was alive, and later a married couple – now zombies – hold hands as they walk). While tests confirm that the reanimated 'zombies' are clinically dead, Twombly talks at length about the limitations and strengths of the undead.

Meeting other survivors, and after witnessing an infection and reanimation first-hand, Twombly makes his way northward. His initial suspicions relating to a new GM food additive made by chemical company Primodyne are explored, although evidence relating to its accumulated toxicity is inconclusive, although its sudden prevalence and bio-accumulative effect does provide a logical explanation for the speed of the global infection, as well as the infection occasionally affecting individuals who have not come into direct contact with the zombies.

Twombly spends much time on a small, isolated bucolic inn called 'the Farm' with nineteen other survivors, although eventually he is forced to move even further northward after the Farm is overrun by zombies and burned down. Finally he finds the town of Churchill, Manitoba where nobody has had any interaction with the infected.

His final entry indicates that the threat is apparently subsiding, with the town secure and partially fortified. The entry is, however, cut off mid-word with a slight spatter of blood.
