= Don Roff =

American novelist

- Roff reads one of his books to a classroom at a West Seattle school, March 2008
- Born: December 13, 1966 (age 59); Walla Walla, Washington, U.S.
- Education: Evergreen State College
- Occupation: Writer
- Writing career
- Genres: Horror fiction, Fantasy, Dark humor
- Website: donvroff.com

Don Roff (born December 13, 1966, in Walla Walla, Washington) is a writer and filmmaker.

Roff grew up in Milton-Freewater, Oregon. He worked at the local drive-in theater and made Super 8 mm and VHS movies with his neighborhood friends. He graduated from McLoughlin Union High School in 1985. Roff joined the United States Army in 1989 and became a US Army Ranger. He was stationed at Fort Benning, Georgia in the 3d Ranger Battalion, and was a part of Operation Just Cause in Panama. He graduated from Walla Walla Community College in 1995 and the Evergreen State College in 1997. After living in Seattle, Washington and New York City, Roff returned to Walla Walla, Washington in 2011. In June 2006, Roff received the Zola Award for screenwriting from the Pacific Northwest Writers Association.

== Bibliography ==
- Scary Stories (2006)
- Tales of Terror (2007)
- Dragon Adventures (2007)
- True Scary Stories (2007)
- Creepy Stories (2008)
- Vampire Tales (2009)
- Ghost Quest (2009)
- Zombies: A Record of the Year of Infection (2009)
- Werewolf Tales (2010)
- Real-Life Hauntings (2010)
- Zombie Tales (2011)
- Haunted Tales (2011)
- Ghost Hauntings: America's Most Haunted Places (2011)
- Heebie-Jeebies: Volume One (2012)
- Terrifying Tales (2012)
- Terrifying Tales Vol. 2 (2014)
- Snowblind (2015)
- Ghost Detective (2016)
- Clare at Sixteen (2021)
- Clare at Seventeen (2022)
- Usher House Rising (2023)
- Clare at Eighteen (2024)

=== Anthology ===
- Sherlock Holmes: The Crossover Casebook (2011)
- Underneath the Juniper Tree Anthology (2013)
- The Spider: Extreme Prejudice (2013)

=== Podcasts ===
- Darkside Drive (2016-2018)
- R.L. Stine's Story Club: Ivy's Chilling Tales (2021-2023)

== Filmography ==
=== Short films ===
- A Night in the Life of the Vampire (1996)
- The Weird World of Mushroom Madness (1997)
- Vrooom! (2008)

=== Feature films ===
- The House of Malik (2011)
- Saint Clare (2024)
- Oscar Shaw (2026)
