= Deadline (Grant novel) =

2011 novel by Mira Grant

- First edition
- Author: Seanan McGuire (writing as Mira Grant)
- Language: English
- Series: Newsflesh
- Genre: Science fiction/horror
- Publisher: Orbit Books
- Publication date: May 2011
- Publication place: United States
- Pages: 519 pp.
- ISBN: 978-1-84149-899-7
- OCLC: 751500639
- Preceded by: Feed
- Followed by: Blackout

Deadline, published by Orbit Books in 2011, is the second book in the Newsflesh series, a science fiction/horror series written by Seanan McGuire under the pen name Mira Grant. Deadline is preceded by Feed (2010) and succeeded by Blackout (2012).

Set after a zombie apocalypse and written from the perspective of blog journalist Shaun Mason, Deadline delves deeper into the conspiracy unveiled during the events of Feed (2010), while depicting Shaun's attempts to deal with the loss of his sister Georgia. Deadline delves more into the origins of the zombie-causing virus, and how humanity is responding to it on societal, biological, and psychological levels.

Reviews of Deadline have highlighted the book's improvements over Feed and McGuire's avoidance of the problems normally associated with the middle work of a trilogy. There is particular praise for the characterization of Shaun and his attempts to deal with the loss of a loved one along with the ever-growing crisis. Deadline was a finalist for the 2012 Hugo Award for Best Novel.

== Plot ==
A year after the events of Feed, Shaun Mason is still coming to terms with killing his infected sister, Georgia. He has stepped back from his role as an Irwin to lead the entire After the End Times team. Throughout the novel, he has auditory and visual hallucinations in which Georgia speaks to him. His mental health gradually destabilizes, causing concerns about his colleagues.

Shaun returns to Oakland, California with Rebecca "Becks" Atherton (an Irwin), Alaric Kwong (a Newsie), and Dave Novakowski (another Irwin). Dr. Kelly Connolly, a CDC researcher, arrives. Dr. Connolly and her colleagues had been researching the abnormally high death rate among people with K-A reservoir conditions. Reservoir conditions occur when the K-A virus is present, but remains confined to only one part of the body and does not turn the host into a zombie. (Georgia had been diagnosed with retinal K-A as a child, which caused migraines and poor vision but was otherwise asymptomatic.) Kelly's team of researchers also began dying, which is possibly linked to the conspiracy uncovered in the previous book. Kelly faked her own death with a clone in order to escape. During this discussion, a sizable zombie outbreak occurs. Dave sacrifices himself to allow the others to escape.

The team flees to Weed, California, where they meet Magdalene "Maggie" Garcia. Maggie is a Fictional at After the End Times; her parents are wealthy pharmaceutical magnates. They then track down Dr. Shannon Abbey, a scientist unaffiliated with the CDC. Dr. Abbey reveals that reservoir conditions are an immune response to the virus, and those with the conditions may fight off zombification. Shaun and Becks then head to Portland's CDC office, where they escape a zombie outbreak staged to kill them. Shaun sends the collected data to Mahir Gowda, a British resident and the website's head Newsie.

Two weeks later, Mahir arrives in the United States with news that all Kellis-Amberlee substrains were lab-engineered. People with reservoir conditions are being killed off before each new substrain appears. Shaun leads Dr. Connolly, Becks, and Mahir to the CDC office in Memphis, Tennessee, to break in and confront Dr. Connolly's boss, Joseph Wynne. Dr. Wynne reveals he organized the Oakland outbreak to kill Dr. Connolly and the bloggers; he is part of a widespread conspiracy to keep people afraid and compliant while the zombie virus is stabilized. Dr. Wynne is killed, and Dr. Connolly is infected. She sacrifices herself to distract security while the others escape. The team heads back to California, driving through a hurricane and finding most of the country deserted.

When they reach Maggie's estate, Shaun and company learn that most of the country has been locked down following massive outbreaks along the Gulf Coast: a Second Rising. The newest strain is being transmitted by mosquitoes. Dr. Abbey offers Shaun a place in her lab in Shady Cove, Oregon. Shaun and Mahir organize the rest of the site's staff to share what they have learned before those at Maggie's evacuate. Shortly before reaching Shady Cove, Shaun is attacked and bitten, and is quarantined in Dr. Abbey's lab. Despite several tests, he shows no sign of becoming a zombie. The novel's coda reveals that despite her apparent death, Georgia is alive and well in an unknown CDC facility.

== Background and themes ==
Without the framing device of a United States presidential election to use as in Feed (waiting for the next election would have left too much time for the characters' emotional wounds to heal), McGuire chose to focus more on the zombie virus itself: how a lab-engineered virus developed and evolved, and how humans were responding to it, on both societal and biological levels. McGuire also wanted to address the long-term impact of a zombie apocalypse on society and the associated psychological ramifications. Other themes covered in the novel include medical ethics and human responsibility.

Deadline was published in May 2011. The novel was originally to be titled Blackout, but this was changed shortly before publishing to avoid confusion with Connie Willis' novel Blackout (2010), published a year earlier. Grant instead used Blackout as the title for the third Newsflesh novel.

== Reception ==
=== Reviews ===
In reviewing the novel for SFFWorld, Rob Bedford described the book as avoiding the pitfalls normally associated with the middle work in a trilogy and praised McGuire's strong pacing despite the novel's length. Bedford also compliments the author's treatment of the subject of medical ethics (particularly in extreme situations) as well handled and thought-provoking. Selena MacIntosh of Persephone Magazine noted several improvements over Feed, particularly tighter plotting and storytelling, along with deeper characters. However, as MacIntosh was less impressed overall with the first novel, she passes some of the credit for Deadline's success to a new editor McGuire notes was previously uninvolved. In the Seattle Post-Intelligencer, Brian Fitzpatrick wrote McGuire takes the "political intrigue of Feed and ratchets it up to 11" and highly praised the novel's conclusion. He also states that the use of zombies as the means of a hidden agenda make the work scarier than the straightforward "humans versus zombies" scenario in other zombie fiction.

The use of the deceased Georgia as an advisory voice in the slightly unhinged Shaun's head was praised by reviewers: Bedford called it a "great tool to use for internal dialogue" and congratulated McGuire for her ability to set different tones for the two characters, while MacIntosh and Fitzpatrick identified it as a plausible and understandable reaction to the loss of a loved one. MacIntosh also liked the decision to make Shaun "a real tool" as he struggles to deal with both the loss of his sister and the growing conspiracy, with his "raw and messy" state making him a more interesting protagonist than Georgia was in Feed.

The book was compared favourably with Max Brooks' World War Z (2006).

=== Awards and honors ===
Locus included Deadline on their list of the best science fiction novels of 2011.

The novel was nominated for the 2011 Philip K. Dick Award as well as the 2012 Hugo Award for Best Novel. It ultimately lost the latter to Among Others by Jo Walton.
