= Daniel Waters (novelist) =

American author of young adult novels (born 1969)

Daniel Waters (born March 14, 1969) is an American author of young adult novels. He lives in Connecticut with his wife and children.

== Published works ==
- Generation Dead (Hyperion, 2008) According to WorldCat, the book is held in 1275 libraries
  - Translated into Spanish as Generación dead
- Generation Dead: Kiss of Life (Hyperion, 2009) According to WorldCat, the book is held in 2511http://www.worldcat.org/oclc/262883826 libraries
  - Translated into Spanish as Beso de vida
- Generation Dead: Passing Strange (Hyperion, 2010)
  - Translated into Spanish as Extran̋as apariencias
- Generation Dead: Stitches (Hyperion, 2011)
- Break My Heart 1,000 Times (Hyperion, 2012). The film I Still See You (2018) is based upon this novel.
