= The Sacrifice (Higson novel) =

2012 novel by Charlie Higson

- First edition
- Author: Charlie Higson
- Language: English
- Series: The Enemy
- Genre: Horror, Young adult, Thriller
- Publisher: Puffin Books
- Publication date: 20 September 2012
- Publication place: United Kingdom
- Media type: Print (hardcover)
- Pages: 464
- ISBN: 9780141336121
- Preceded by: The Fear
- Followed by: The Fallen

The Sacrifice is a post-apocalyptic young adult horror novel written by best-selling author Charlie Higson. The book, released by Puffin Books in the UK and Australia on 20 September 2012, is the fourth book in a seven-book series, titled The Enemy. The Sacrifice takes place in London, a year after a worldwide sickness has infected adults, turning them into something akin to voracious, cannibalistic zombies, and begins five days after the end of The Fear.

== Background ==
The Sacrifice is the fourth book in the seven-book series The Enemy, with the first novel having first released in UK by Puffin Books on 3 September 2009; Disney Hyperion released it in the US on 11 May 2010. The novel has been described as taking a dark turn compared to previous novels by Southern Daily Echo.

== Summary ==
Small Sam begins to grow restless of his confinement, wishing to see his sister Ella. Jordan, still the Tower leader, sentences Brendan to death for stealing food, but reduces the punishment to exile. Brendan is kicked out of the fortress and wanders off through the so-called "No Go Zone", the heart of Old London where the zombies are said to be extremely dangerous.

Ed and a few other kids head to the pub and rescue a fourteen-year-old girl named Tish. Tish is brought back to the Tower, and put in the same bunk room as Sam and The Kid. She tricks the two boys into believing that Jordan and Ed want to imprison them, and offers to take them across the city to find Ella, which they accept.

The next morning, the trio escape into the No Go Zone. They are chased by a group of zombies and escape into the subway tunnels, where they are cornered by more zombies, but are saved by a group of kids from Tish's group.

At the tower, the trio's disappearance is noticed, and Ed launches a search party. They wind up at the Houses of Parliament with Nicola, who develops a crush on Ed.

Meanwhile, Shadowman meets a group of three kids unaware of The Fear. The kids take him to their headquarters in an IKEA store. There, Shadowman meets the group's leader, Saif.

Sam and The Kid are taken by their rescuers to their home, revealed to be St. Paul's Cathedral. The building is inhabited by a cult run by a boy called Mad Matt. They believe that the two boys are the "Lamb and Goat" on the Angus Day banner. They plan to figure out which of the boys is the "Goat", and sacrifice them so the "Lamb" can cleanse the earth of the zombies. Unable to tell which of them is the Goat, Matt imprisons both. Eventually, Matt locks the Kid inside a cage, deciding to feed him to a zombie the people at the Cathedral call Wormwood. The Kid convinces Wormwood not to eat him, and they work together to escape through a tunnel.

Ed and the rest of his group fight their way into the building, where Ed rescues Sam and The Kid. Whilst Matt barricades himself inside the Cathedral with the rest of his followers, Wormwood helps Ed's group escape by communicating telepathically with the zombies. Ed decides to take Sam to The Natural History Museum.

Shadowman runs into Ed's crew and takes them to a safe hiding spot, where he reveals his real name: Dylan Peake. Ed and Dylan swap notes on St George and his army, and agree to deal with the issue later.

The book ends with Jordan declaring he will clear the No Go Zone.

== Reception ==
Ava Ehde from Voice of Youth Advocates called the novel suspenseful and a "horrifying page-turner", and described the prose as solid and sometimes brilliant. Overall, Ehde stated the book "will appeal to many at both public and school libraries". Daniel Kraus from Booklist described that the new character Wormwood was thrilling, but commented that there was "not much to differentiate teen leader Ed's subsequent rescue operation from similar sequences in previous volumes, and one is tempted to say the series is starting to generate diminishing returns".
