= Feed (Grant novel) =

2010 novel by Mira Grant

- First edition
- Author: Seanan McGuire (writing as Mira Grant)
- Language: English
- Series: Newsflesh
- Genre: Science fiction/horror
- Publisher: Orbit Books
- Publication date: 2010
- Publication place: United States
- Pages: 599 pp
- ISBN: 978-0-316-08105-4
- Followed by: Deadline

Feed is a 2010 science fiction/horror novel written by Seanan McGuire under the pen name Mira Grant. It is the first book in the Newsflesh series, and was followed by Deadline (2011). Set during the aftermath of a zombie apocalypse and written from the perspective of blog journalist Georgia Mason, Feed follows Georgia and her news team as they follow the presidential campaign of Republican senator Peter Ryman. A series of deadly incidents leads Georgia and her brother Shaun to discover efforts to undermine the campaign, linked to a larger conspiracy involving the undead.

McGuire's interests in horror movies and virology inspired her to write the book, but she struggled with the plot until a friend suggested using an election as a framing device. The novel has been praised for its detailed worldbuilding, including the characters' awareness of previous zombie fiction—an element McGuire had found lacking in most horror works. Feed was a finalist for the 2011 Hugo Award for Best Novel.

== Plot ==
=== Premise ===
Feed is set several decades after the zombie apocalypse, referred to as the Rising. Two man-made viruses (a cure for cancer and a cure for the common cold) combined to form Kellis-Amberlee, a virus that quickly infects all mammalian life. Kellis-Amberlee is normally benign, but the virus can "go live" or "amplify", converting any host mammal over 40 pounds (18 kg) into a zombie. Amplification may take place in several ways: the death of the host, contact with infected bodily fluids, and spontaneous conversion.

Most humans now reside in tightly controlled safe zones, with rigorous blood testing and decontamination protocols used to prevent the spread of the live K-A virus. After the inaction of traditional media during the Rising, blogs and other new media have taken over as the primary source of information and entertainment; bloggers are recognized as professional journalists, with subgroups including "Newsies" (objective, fact-based reporters), "Irwins" (field workers), and "Fictionals" (fictional content and poetry creators).

=== Plot summary ===
In the year 2040, the blog After the End Times is selected to cover a presidential campaign. The team consists of Georgia "George" Mason, a Newsie; her adoptive brother Shaun, an Irwin; and their friend Georgette "Buffy" Meissonier, a Fictional and technology guru. Their coverage focuses on the presidential campaign of Senator Peter Ryman, a moderate Republican. When the campaign reaches Eakly, Oklahoma, zombies attack the campaign convoy. The team later discovers that this was an orchestrated attack. At the Republican National Convention, Ryman faces off against religious, right-wing Governor David Tate. During the convention, journalist Rick Cousins defects from the campaign of a minor candidate to join After the End Times. Ryman is selected as the Republican presidential candidate. During the convention, a zombie outbreak at Ryman's horse ranch kills his eldest daughter. Georgia and company investigate the ranch, learning that the outbreak started after a horse was injected with the live virus. Ryman selects Tate as his vice-presidential candidate.

The bloggers drive their vehicles and equipment overland. During the trip, the journalists' convoy is attacked by a sniper. Georgia, Shaun, and Rick survive; Buffy is bitten. As she dies, Buffy confesses to leaking information to a group undermining Ryman's campaign; the attack occurred because she had refused to continue. After killing Buffy, Georgia calls for rescue. The CDC arrives and takes the surviving group members for testing. After their release, the team digs into the underlying conspiracy, souring the bloggers' relationship with Ryman and Tate. The team finds evidence linking Tate to the attacks, along with hints of a broader conspiracy involving the CDC and other parties. When Georgia confronts Ryman during an event in Sacramento, California, he is skeptical. He instructs the bloggers to find concrete proof or risk being fired from the campaign. As the bloggers leave, they are attacked. Georgia is shot with a tranquiliser dart containing the live virus. Rick escapes with a copy of the group's evidence just before a zombie outbreak begins. Shaun helps Georgia expose the conspiracy through one last blog post. She then begins amplifying, forcing Shaun to shoot her.

Shaun and the surviving security detail contain the outbreak. He breaks into the convention center to confront Ryman and Tate. Tate takes Ryman's wife hostage with a syringe of the K-A virus. He claims that his actions were intended to use fear of zombies to reshape America into a more faith-based society. Then the governor injects himself with the syringe. Shaun shoots him to prevent zombification.

== Background ==
McGuire was inspired to write Feed by her interests in horror movies and virology. She wanted a zombie virus that would be society-changing but survivable, and spent two years developing the concepts of the virus and its consequences. Another aspect she wanted to address was that characters in horror fiction typically lack awareness of concepts from other popular works of horror fiction; as such, in Feed, movies like Dawn of the Dead (1978) are credited with helping the human race survive.

Despite establishing the above-mentioned background, McGuire struggled with the plot until a friend suggested using a presidential campaign as a framing device. This allowed McGuire to explore a large cross-section of issues and demonstrate the life-changing result of the zombie apocalypse.

== Reception ==
=== Reviews ===
Zack Handlen's review of the novel for The A.V. Club describes Feed as "The West Wing by way of George A. Romero". He singles out the level of detail in McGuire's worldbuilding for praise, and he observes that although most of the cast are stock characters, this is not a major obstacle in enjoying the book's narrative.

Writing for Strange Horizons, Jonathan McCalmont praised Feed as a "delight", highlighting its overall structure, well written action and dialogue, and detailed worldbuilding. However, McCalmont found it hard to take the book at face value as a political thriller, and chose to interpret it as a merciless satire of contemporary journalism and the issues associated with it.

The fact that Feed and its characters acknowledge previous zombie fiction is praised by Schlock Mercenary webcartoonist Howard Tayler.

=== Awards and honors ===
Feed was listed as number 74 in NPR's 2010 "Top 100 Killer Thrillers" poll. Publishers Weekly included it on their list of the best books of 2010.

Awards for Feed
Year	Award	Category	Result	Ref.
2010	Romantic Times Reviewers’ Choice Award	Science Fiction Novel	Finalist	
2010	Shirley Jackson Award	Novel	Nominated	
2011	Audie Award	Science Fiction	Finalist	
2011	Hugo Award	Novel	Finalist	

== Alternate ending ==
Shortly before the 22 May release of Blackout (2012), McGuire released an alternate ending to Feed, titled Fed. The ending was initially made available on Facebook on 17 May, then released online by Orbit on 23 May.

The new ending starts shortly after Ryman kicks Georgia, Shaun, and Rick out of the Sacramento event, and diverges with the virus dart hitting Shaun instead of Georgia. Georgia and Rick retreat inside the van to post their findings on Tate and the conspiracy, while Shaun dies defending them from the outbreak. Georgia confronts and kills Tate, then commits suicide a week later, unable to live in a world without Shaun. The perspective changes to Rick's, broken and alcoholic, as he organizes the Masons' funerals. He notes that the conspiracy may not have ended with Tate, but "someone else was going to have to save the world next time."
