= Generation Dead =

2008 book by Daniel Waters

- First edition (US)
- Author: Daniel Waters
- Cover artist: Ali Smith
- Language: English
- Genre: Young adult, Fantasy, Romance
- Publisher: Hyperion Books
- Publication date: May 2008
- Publication place: United States
- Media type: Print Paperback,
- Pages: 392
- ISBN: 978-1-84738-327-3
- OCLC: 225446468
- Followed by: Kiss of Life

Generation Dead is a young adult supernatural romance novel by Daniel Waters.

The book is a modern reworking of the zombie genre of fiction. It follows a girl named Phoebe and her best friends, Margi and Adam, whose world has been left baffled by a strange phenomenon – dead teenagers not staying dead. For reasons unknown, a small number of the teenaged dead are returning to 'life'. They lack a heartbeat and all other traditional life-signs (respiration, digestion, etc.) but are capable of thought, movement and speech (to varying extents). They are widely feared by the living, but Phoebe finds herself attracted to Tommy Williams, one of the "living impaired" teens at her school.

== Plot summary ==
The protagonist of the story is goth teenager Phoebe Kendall who, along with her best friends Margi and Adam, attends the fictional Oakvale High School. The world in which the story takes place is a strange one, with a supernatural phenomenon that causes dead teenagers to wake from their graves and move about like regular people—except they don't breathe.

With help from the school's principal, Tommy joins Oakvale High's football team. The coach is openly hostile towards him and instructs the other players (in particular Pete, his lackeys Stavis and Harris, and Adam) to do their utmost to injure him so severely that he can no longer play. Adam refuses, and Pete and the others fail. Adam and another living boy, Thornton Harrowood, come to accept Tommy, but when the team plays their first match, they are harassed by anti-zombie protestors. Tommy bargains with the coach, promising to quit as long as he can play, however briefly, in the second half of the game.

The school is also visited by the Hunter Foundation, which aims to promote tolerance and understanding of the living impaired. Founders Alish and Angela Hunter announce a work and study program open to all students, intended to improve relations between traditionally and differently biotic people. Phoebe, Margi, Adam and Thornton are the only living students to sign up for the class (affectionately referred to as 'Undead Studies'), along with their differently biotic classmates Tommy, Karen, Evan, Colette, Kevin, Sylvia and Tayshawn. When the class list is posted publicly in the school, Pete steals it, planning to go after each of the class members in turn.

It is revealed that Pete's first love, a girl called Julie, died suddenly of an asthma attack some time ago and did not 'come back'. As a result of this, he harbours a deep bitterness and hatred for all differently biotic people, believing them to be unworthy of the second chance that Julie was denied. His mental stability is uncertain, since he sees hallucinations of Julie semi-frequently and often refers to Karen and Phoebe as 'Julie' by mistake.

Tommy takes Phoebe and Adam to an abandoned house deep in the nearby Oxoboxo Woods. A number of the living impaired who were abandoned by their families reside there and refer to it as 'The Haunted House'. Tommy takes Phoebe upstairs and shows her the 'Wall of the Dead' - a wall of photographs of zombie kids from all over the country. He then tells her to lie down on the floor in the darkness. When she does, he leaves her there for a short time. She becomes frightened and Tommy later tells her that now she knows how it feels to be dead.

Tommy invites Phoebe to his house so he can show her his blog on a website called mysocalledundeath.com, which he uses to get in touch with other undead teenagers and to campaign for rights for the living impaired. Phoebe, knowing that her parents will disapprove of her associating with a dead boy, asks Adam and Margi to cover for her. It has been established by now that Adam has feelings for Phoebe and is unhappy about her developing relationship with Tommy, but he agrees. He and Margi visit the Oxoboxo Lake, where Colette drowned a few years earlier. When she was alive, Colette was best friends with Phoebe and Margi (the three of them being collectively known as 'The Weird Sisters') but they haven't spoken since her death, which is a source of constant guilt and misery for Margi.

Soon after in Undead Studies, Colette tells the class about her experiences following her return from death. She walked seven miles from the morgue to her family home, where her mother screamed at her to go away and her father threatened her with a shovel. (The family later left Oakvale without Colette.) She then went to a friend's house but was turned away again. Margi bursts into tears and protests that she was scared, ultimately revealing that this 'friend' was her. She runs out of the class, whilst Phoebe stays and reconciles with Colette. Margi later refuses to return to the class and is removed from the program.

Meanwhile, all over the country, undead teenagers are being brutally 'reterminated' (i.e. killed permanently, which involves the irreparable destruction of the brain). There are no laws against murdering zombies since they are, technically, already dead. Furthermore, since the differently biotic are widely shunned by living society, the stories of their murders do not even make it into the news. Tommy is constantly doing research into the crimes against the undead, and presents his findings at each meeting of the Undead Studies class. Many of the reterminations seem to involve a mysterious 'white van', suggesting that the killings are planned and systematic. Phoebe and the other living students are horrified, whilst the undead members of the class are unsurprised and seem quite aware that many people would like to see them destroyed.

Phoebe and Tommy finally go out on a date and see a movie, after which Tommy asks her to the homecoming dance. He tells her she doesn't have to answer straight away, though she later says yes.

Pete makes his first move against the members of the Undead Studies class. His first target is Evan Talbot, a red-headed zombie with a sense of humour that Adam is fond of. Pete, with help from Stavis and Harris, reterminates Evan using a maul. Adam, who was aware of the threats Pete was making towards the living impaired kids, suspects he is the perpetrator, and Pete indirectly confirms his suspicions.

Tommy arranges a meeting at the Haunted House to discuss Evan's murder. There, Phoebe and Adam meet Takayuki, a dead boy with a large section of his right cheek missing (leading to Adam nicknaming him 'Smiley') and a marked dislike for the living. When Adam reveals that it was Pete who killed Evan, Tommy announces that they will go to the police with the information. Takayuki is disgusted by this, believing that the police will do nothing, and he and a few other zombies leave. Tommy and Karen then announce their plans to host a party at the Haunted House after homecoming, since many of the undead kids will be unable to attend the dance. Phoebe feels that Adam was being rude and insensitive at the meeting, especially to Takayuki, and they have their first argument.

On the school bus the next day, Margi tells Phoebe that she is coming back to Undead Studies. Colette approaches them; Margi apologises to her and Colette invites her to the homecoming party at the Haunted House. Later, Margi and Phoebe ask Karen how she died and she tells them, to their shock, that she committed suicide by taking an overdose.

The homecoming dance seems to go smoothly, but unbeknownst to Phoebe and the others, Pete's next target is Tommy, and he plans on attacking him at the after-party (which he found out about by bullying the information out of Thornton). He and Stavis (it is mentioned that Harris, after assisting in Evan's murder, has refused to be part of Pete's schemes any longer) follow the group to the Haunted House. Tommy and Phoebe go outside into the woods to talk. Tommy tells her that he died in a car crash that also killed his father, and reveals that the zombies with the highest level of functionality are the ones who are loved by their friends or families even after their deaths. (This explains why zombies like Colette, who was abandoned by her family and, until recently, ignored by her friends, move and speak so slowly.) Tommy states his belief that if he can get a living girl to fall in love with him and kiss him, he'll come 'back to life' even more. Phoebe has been concerned for a while that Tommy is only interested in her because she is alive, and this seems to confirm her fears.

Pete, who has been watching them, is gripped by a hallucination – instead of Phoebe, he sees Julie, and believes that she is about to cheat on him with Tommy. He is armed with a gun, which he intended to use to shoot Tommy, but instead takes aim at Phoebe.

Meanwhile, back at the party, Karen advises Adam to tell Phoebe how he feels about her. He goes to find her and hears her screams. Following the sound, he sees Pete about to shoot. Without hesitation, he throws himself into the line of fire and is shot in the chest. Realizing what they've done, Stavis and Pete flee the scene. Pete is caught by Takayuki, who inflicts an injury on Pete's face similar to his own.

The screams and gunshot alert the rest of the party-goers to the confrontation, and everyone emerges from the Haunted House and gathers around Adam while Phoebe cries out at them to help, though she knows that Adam is already dead. However, within minutes he returns from death, and is at first completely unaware that he was killed. He realizes something is wrong when he tries to talk and move as normal and finds he can't, and then Phoebe tells him what happened. He tries to tell her that he loves her, but manages only an incoherent gurgle. When the police and an ambulance finally arrive, Phoebe decides that she is going to do everything in her power to bring Adam back as much as possible.

== Characters ==
Phoebe Kendall ('Pheeble') is one of the main characters in the books, she is described as being a goth who is tall, has a thin slightly curved frame, with hazel/green eyes and long black messy hair. It is stated that her angular features make her face seem heart shaped. She is said to wear mostly all black clothing consisting of heeled boots and dresses or skirts. She enjoys bands such as 'The Creeps', 'Slipknot', 'The Killdeaths', 'Misfits', 'The Rosedales', 'Serphim Shade' and various other emo/goth bands.

Margi is Phoebe's best friend in the books. She is described as having short spiky pink hair with spiky bangs, having a short frame with large breasts and slightly chubbier body. She is described wearing much jewelry, namely multiple bangles and teardrop earrings, and it is insinuated that she wears fairly revealing clothing. She is also a goth.

Adam is Phoebe's and Margi's friend who is a member of the football team, he is described as having 'bulked up' over the summer as he used to have a little bit more chub, whereas now he is very tall (tallest on the football team) with a strong, broad V-shaped body and brown hair.

Tommy is one of the 'living impaired' kids who is described as having cold dead eyes that are a pale blue colour and shaggy grey blond hair.

Pete is described as a large football player who comes across as antagonistic, he is said to have light brown hair.

Colette is an old friend of Phoebe and Margi, she is one of the 'living impaired' kids.

== Sequel ==
Two sequels to the novel, Kiss of Life and Passing Strange, have been released in 2009 and 2010 respectively.
