= Preparedness 101: Zombie Apocalypse =

Centers for Disease Control and Prevention blog post

"Preparedness 101: Zombie Apocalypse" is a blog post made in May 2011 by the United States Centers for Disease Control and Prevention (CDC) that uses a zombie apocalypse to raise public awareness of emergency preparedness. In a blog post titled "Preparedness 101: Zombie Apocalypse", the director of the CDC's Office of Public Health Preparedness and Response, Rear Admiral Ali S. Khan writes: "Take a zombie apocalypse for example. That's right, I said z-o-m-b-i-e a-p-o-c-a-l-y-p-s-e. You may laugh now, but when it happens you'll be happy you read this, and hey, maybe you'll even learn a thing or two about how to prepare for a real emergency." Comparing the upcoming hurricane season and possible pandemics to "flesh-eating zombies" from the horror film Night of the Living Dead and the video game series Resident Evil, Khan recommends Americans prepare for natural disasters as they would have prepared for "ravenous monsters". The blog post was part of a larger zombie-themed campaign retired by mid-2022 and replaced with the Prep Your Health CDC website.

== Inspiration ==
A week before the zombie apocalypse post, members of the CDC group responsible for preparedness of the public for natural disasters and pandemics were working on the message anticipating the 2011 hurricane season. Health communication specialists from CDC/OPHPR's Communication Office remembered a tweet about zombies in connection to the nuclear disaster in Japan resulting from the Tōhoku earthquake and tsunami. This provided the idea for the upcoming CDC post, implemented on May 18, 2011 along with two tweets:

The whole idea was, if you're prepared for a zombie apocalypse, you're prepared for pretty much anything, said Drew RN.

== Blog post ==
The CDC's blog post included precautionary tips about zombies along with its usual tips for preparing an emergency kit, as well as emergency escape routes in case of an earthquake or hurricane. For example, after explaining how the public should be prepared "if zombies started appearing outside your doorstep", it continues: "You can also implement this plan if there is a flood, earthquake, or other emergency."

Plan your evacuation route. When zombies are hungry they won't stop until they get food (i.e., brains), which means you need to get out of town fast! Plan where you would go and multiple routes you would take ahead of time so that the flesh eaters don't have a chance! This is also helpful when natural disasters strike and you have to take shelter fast.

Some commentators noted that May 21, 2011, the date predicted by Harold Camping as the beginning of the end-times, was several days after the blog post, though there was no mention of this speculation in the post itself.

== CDC website crash ==
The blog post generated Internet traffic that eventually crashed the CDC website. Usually, CDC blog posts get traffic between 1,000 and 3,000 hits per week. 60,000 hits were reported by the evening of May 18. The post, oriented at "a young, media-savvy demographic", was read by so many that "by Thursday, it was a trending topic on Twitter". Initially the tweet with the tagline If you're ready for a zombie apocalypse, then you're ready for any emergency got 12,000 followers; overnight the number of followers increased to 1.2 million, or 100 times the initial number. Daigle commented that the number of followers of the CDC's zombie apocalypse tweets was comparable to the number of followers of the wedding of Prince William and Catherine Middleton: "We were trending yesterday! Things like the Royal Wedding trend. Not the CDC."

Robert Pestronk, executive director of the National Association of County and City Health Officials, agreed that "The 'Zombie Apocalypse' scenario [was] a great way of getting information out so people can understand the need for preparedness".

== Reaction ==
Daigle said people were visiting the CDC's blog and following CDC tweets because they were mostly interested in zombies and were asking what weapons the agency would recommend to fight zombies. Khan's response to this inquiry was, "remember, we're a public-health center, so we're not going to recommend weapons. We'll leave that to the law-enforcement folks." Chris Good from The Atlantic saw the absence of weapons recommendations (albeit, tongue-in-cheek) as a "downside to the CDC's warning" and wrote: "If a zombie apocalypse does happen—and this is important—do not follow the CDC's guidelines as your only course of action. The CDC zombie plan includes no mention of shotguns, torches, hot-wiring cars, seeking high ground, traveling at night vs. day, or really any worthwhile strategy for keeping zombies out of your house. Parts of it are good, but it probably would serve the public better in the event of, for instance, a hurricane."

Others were concerned about taxpayer money being used for the CDC's budget; the CDC assured the public there was no additional cost for their zombie apocalypse blog post.

Bill Gentry with the UNC-Chapel Hill School of Public Health said that the CDC deserves credit for trying something different, "but that doesn't mean the agency should start using vampires to promote vaccinations or space aliens to warn about the dangers of smoking."

In February 2013, the government of the Canadian province of Quebec followed the CDC's lead in using zombies as a hypothetical example of a pandemic-type disaster that would require emergency preparedness. A few days later, a tongue-in-cheek exchange ensued in the Canadian House of Commons between MP Pat Martin and Minister of Foreign Affairs John Baird, referring to the zombie preparedness plans in Quebec and the United States. The exchange drew international media attention.

== Video contest ==
The CDC announced a contest for the most creative and effective videos covering preparedness for a zombie apocalypse or apocalypse of any kind. In this video contest, the CDC challenged contestants to upload videos to YouTube demonstrating how they are preparing for emergency situations such as floods, earthquakes, hurricanes and zombie attacks.

== Graphic novel ==
Preparedness 101: Zombie Pandemic
- Author: Maggie Silver; James Archer; Bob Hobbs; Alissa Eckert; Mark Conner; Centers for Disease Control and Prevention (U.S.)
- Illustrator: Bob Hobbs
- Language: English
- Genre: Graphic novel, Government publication
- Publisher: Centers for Disease Control and Prevention, U.S. Dept. of Health and Human Services
- Publication date: 2011
- Pages: 40
- OCLC: 854576760
- Text: Preparedness 101: Zombie Pandemic at CDC Stacks

In October 2011, the CDC published a Zombie Pandemic graphic novella written and created by Maggie Silver, with help from fantasy artist Bob Hobbs (layouts, pencils and inks), Alissa Eckert (coloring) and Mark Conner (lettering, assembly).

== Analyzing results ==
The CDC is planning to run a survey to find out how many of the blog's readers actually followed the tips and made recommended preparations for natural disasters, zombie attacks and other emergency situations.

== See also ==
- The Zombie Survival Guide
- Zombie Squad
- CONPLAN 8888
