= Frostbite (Wellington novel) =

2006 horror novel by David Wellington

- Author: David Wellington
- Cover artist: Kyle Kolker
- Language: English
- Genre: Horror
- Publisher: brokentype
- Publication date: August 2006 (online) 2009 (print)
- Publication place: United States
- Media type: ebook, paperback
- Pages: 277
- ISBN: 978-0-307-46083-7
- Followed by: Overwinter

Frostbite is a horror novel by American writer David Wellington, published in serial online in July, 2006 and in print in 2009.

== Plot summary ==
Frostbite takes place in the remote wilderness of Alberta. The setting is similar to the real world, but where werewolves (and possibly other supernatural phenomena) are rare but known phenomena.

The novel opens with Cheyenne "Chey" Clarke parachuting into the wilds of Alberta, provisioned with extensive hiking supplies, most of which are immediately lost. Chey is soon attacked by a werewolf (it is indicated to the reader that the creature is obviously not a normal wolf), but survives with only a scratch, which is enough to curse her with lycanthropy.

In wandering the wilderness, she meets the enigmatic Dzo, who introduces her to Monty Powell, a werewolf (presumably the one who attacked Chey). After their meeting, it is revealed that Chey has secretly come looking for the werewolf, and is working with outside parties who want him removed.

After a failed attempt to kill Powell, Chey is left in the care of her backers, and used as bait to lure Powell while her own future at their hands remains questionable.

== The nature of werewolves in Frostbite ==
Werewolves in Frostbite have only two forms; human and lupine. They cannot control the change, and take on lupine form at any time that the moon is above the horizon, regardless of the moon's phase. The lupine form is similar to a normal wolf, but significantly stronger and more aggressive, bearing an intense hatred of humans. They have elements of the dire wolf, including unusually wicked teeth. Even in human form, the werewolf is notably stronger, faster and more resilient than a normal human of its physique.

Werewolves in either form have only a hazy recollection of events in their other form. Though the lupine form hates its own human form as much as (or more than) other humans, there is a slight mental connection, and the lupine form will often try to complete a task that the human form was engaged in when it changed. Still, some werewolves in human form are known to think of "their wolf" as a separate entity.

Unlike many representations of werewolves, one form does not "morph" into the other. Rather, it is as if the body becomes ephemeral and a new body is created, at every change. As a result, werewolves seem to be unaging, as a new perfect body (healed of injuries) is created for it at moonrise and moonset. Werewolves are also apparently immortal, as a dead werewolf (in either form) will return to life with the next change, unless silver is employed to kill it.

Silver is the nemesis of werewolves, as even a relatively light binding of silver chain cannot be broken by one. The effects of long-term contact with silver, or of silver weaponry, are not yet clear. It is known that contact with silver bindings in lupine form can leave a lasting mark when the werewolf regains human form.

== Connection with other works ==
While Wellington has stated that the world is not the same as that of his Monster Trilogy or Thirteen Bullets, there is at least some connection in the form of the recurring character Bannerman Clarke, who was a main character (but presumably killed) in Monster Nation. Since Monster Nation takes place at an earlier date than events in Frostbite, this clearly cannot be precisely the same character, but an alternate world version of him.

== Release details ==
Frostbite was first available as an online serialization. It was then released in print format on October 6, 2009.

== Reception ==
The novel has garnered largely positive reviews. Horrorreview.com stated that the novel was an "even balance of action and suspense"., while Horrorbound.com states Wellington brings " something new and utterly unique to the werewolf mythos".
