= Zombie apocalypse =

Subgenre of apocalyptic fiction

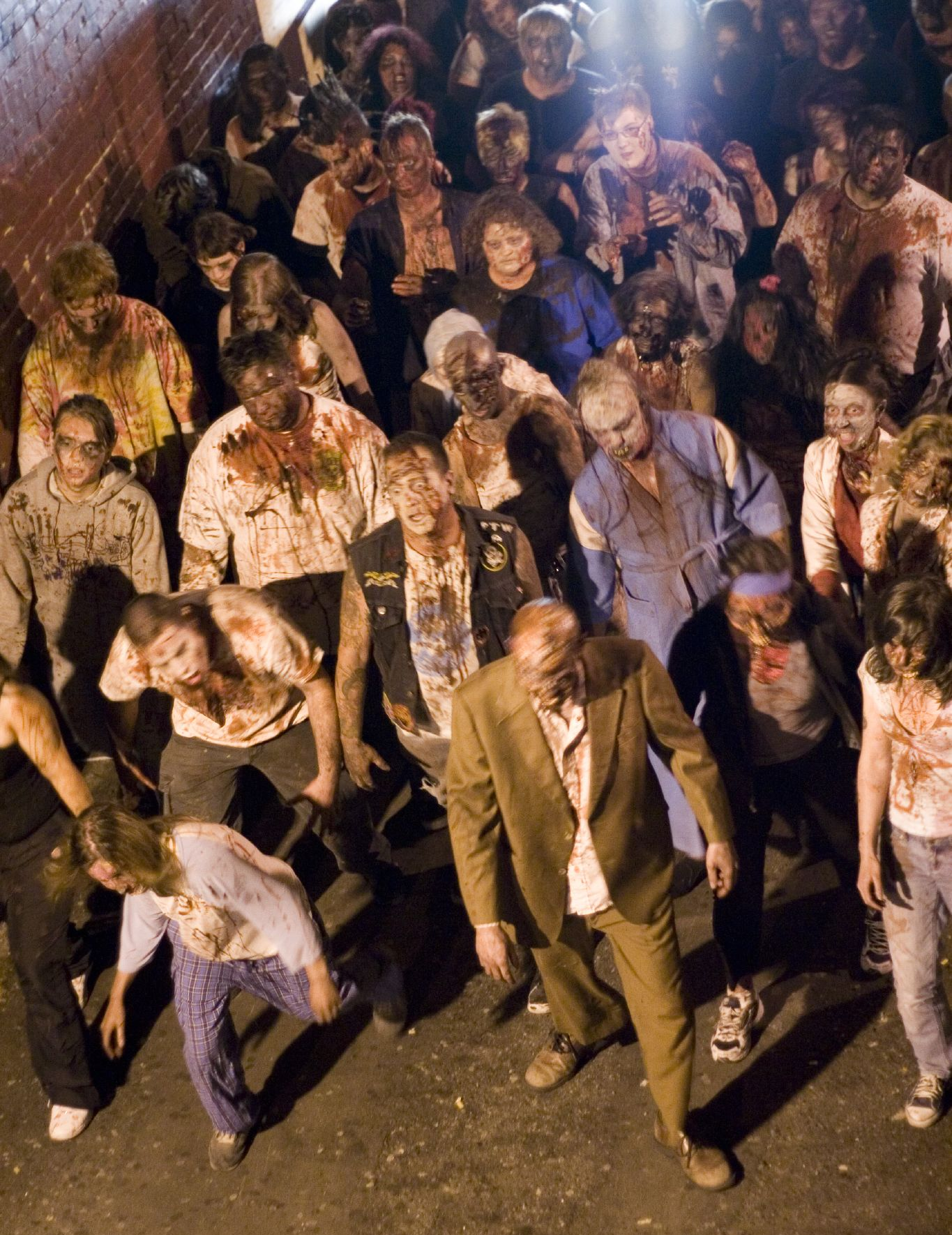
A group of actors as zombies during the shooting of the zombie apocalypse film Meat Market 3

Zombie apocalypse is a subgenre of apocalyptic and post-apocalyptic fiction in which society collapses due to overwhelming swarms of zombies. Usually, only a few individuals or small bands of human survivors are left living.

There are many different causes of a zombie apocalypse in fiction. In some versions, the reason the dead rise and attack humans is unknown; in others, a parasite or infection is the cause - framing the film like a plague. Some stories have every corpse zombify regardless of the cause of death, whereas others require exposure to the infection, most commonly in the form of a bite.

The genre originated in the 1968 American horror film Night of the Living Dead, which was directed by George A. Romero, who took inspiration from the 1954 novel I Am Legend by Richard Matheson. Romero's film introduced the concept of the flesh-eating zombie and spawned numerous other fictional works, including other zombie films, video games, and literature.

The zombie apocalypse has been used as a metaphor for various contemporary fears, such as global contagion, the breakdown of society, and the end of the world. It has repeatedly been referenced in the media and has inspired various fan activities such as zombie walks, making zombie apocalypse a dominant genre in popular culture.

== Origins ==
The myth of the zombie originated in Haiti in the 17th and 18th centuries when African slaves were brought in to work on sugar plantations under the rule of France. The slaves believed that if they ended their own lives by suicide they would be condemned to spend eternity trapped in their own bodies as the undead. This myth evolved in the Voodoo religion into the Haitian belief that corpses were reanimated by shamans. The zombie concept eventually infiltrated western culture with the publication of the first example of zombie fiction in 1927, which was a book titled The Magic Island written by William Seabrook. The book was later adapted for cinema as the 1932 film White Zombie. Directed by Victor Halperin and starring Bela Lugosi, it was the first feature-length zombie film, establishing the sub genre of zombies and paving the way for the zombie apocalypse in cinema.

An early inspirational work of the genre was Richard Matheson's novel I Am Legend (1954), which features a lone survivor named Robert Neville waging a war against a human population transformed into vampires. The novel has been adapted into several screenplays, including The Last Man on Earth (1964), starring Vincent Price, The Omega Man (1971), starring Charlton Heston and I Am Legend (2007) starring Will Smith. George A. Romero took inspiration from Matheson and developed the idea with his apocalyptic feature Night of the Living Dead (1968), but for vampires he substituted shuffling ghouls. Romero stated, "I confessed to him that I basically ripped the idea off from I Am Legend. He forgave me because we didn't make any money. He said, 'Well, as long as you didn't get rich, it's okay.'" Romero said that he never referred to the monsters in his film as "zombies". Instead, the term appeared in an article in Cahiers du Cinéma. Romero commented that earlier depictions of zombies in film, "were very Caribbean and it was all to do with voodoo". By contrast his versions were flesh-eating monsters returned from the grave: "We thought up very few rules or powers for them. The idea was they are your neighbours in a different state. One of the few early ideas we did have was that you have to shoot them in the head to kill them".

== Story elements ==
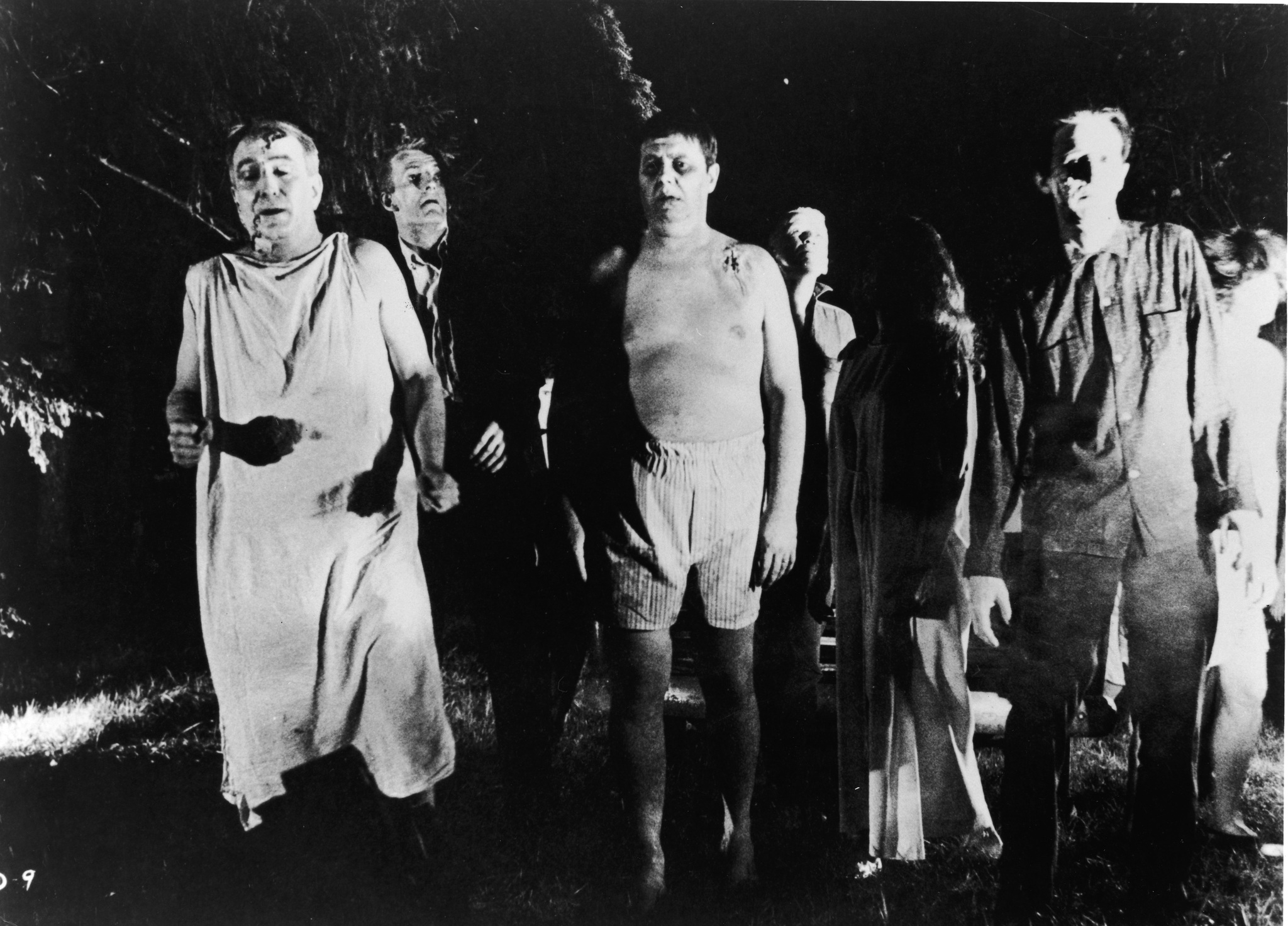
Night of the Living Dead established most of the tropes associated with the genre, including unintelligent but relentless zombies.

Several themes and tropes commonly appear in zombie-apocalypse films:

- Initial contacts with zombies are extremely traumatic, causing shock, panic, disbelief, and possibly denial, hampering survivors' ability to deal with hostile encounters.
- Official responses to the threat are slower than its rate of growth, giving the zombie plague time to expand beyond containment. This results in the collapse of society. Zombies take full control while small groups of the living must fight for their survival.
- The plot usually follows a single group of survivors caught up in the sudden rush of the crisis. The narrative generally focuses on the characters' attempts to survive on their own, concentrating on their reactions to the catastrophe and the group's consequent safety.

Generally, films have depicted zombies as the slow, lumbering, and unintelligent kind first popularized in the 1968 film Night of the Living Dead. Zombies were repeatedly shown in slow-walking groups demonstrating herd behavior and overwhelming victims by strength of numbers. In the 2000s, several films featured zombies that are depicted as more agile, vicious, intelligent, and stronger than the traditional zombie. In many cases of these "fast" zombies, e.g., 28 Days Later, Zombieland, Train to Busan, Dying Light, The Last of Us, and Left 4 Dead, the plot involves not re-animated corpses but living humans infected with a pathogen. Improved CGI technology and the rise of first-person shooter video games resulted in the herd behavior being replaced by zombies capable of running, jumping, and attacking as individuals.

== Thematic subtext ==
From the beginnings of the genre, film makers have used the zombie apocalypse as a metaphor for various cultural fears and social tensions, including the spread of disease and plague. The narrative of a zombie apocalypse carries strong connections to the turbulent social landscape of the United States in the 1960s when the originator of this genre, the film Night of the Living Dead, was created.

At the time when Romero was shooting the film, Americans were viewing televised images of various violent events, including the 1967 Newark riots, 1967 Detroit riot and the Vietnam War. Erin C. Cassese, associate professor of political science, commented that public fears over racial tensions are reflected in the faces of the zombie horde in the film and that the dehumanisation of the zombie is a warning about human psychology. This commentary on the civil war between races was however accidental. Romero had hired African-American actor Duane Jones simply because he was the best actor, but noted that after finishing the film, "that very night we heard the news that Martin Luther King had been shot. There were race riots everywhere". Christopher Shaw writing for The Guardian noted that Romero's 1978 follow-up film Dawn of the Dead is a satire on consumer society. In the film, zombies overrun a shopping mall where survivors have taken refuge. Javier Zarracina for Vox commented, "The zombies in Dawn of the Dead underscore the fears of capitalism and mindless consumption that racked the late 1970s". From the 1980s, the zombie apocalypse was driven by a fear of global contagion, due to the appearance of Ebola in 1976, AIDS in 1980, Avian Flu in the mid-90s and SARS in 2003.

This fear of contagion provided creators with a new explanation for the zombie apocalypse. The contagion concept was used in the 1996 video game Resident Evil and the 2002 film 28 Days Later. From the beginning of the post-apocalyptic television series The Walking Dead in 2010, the predominant theme shifted from a fear of the zombie horde to the fear of other humans. The series focuses on small groups of survivors driven by self-preservation and protected by walls designed to keep out both the zombies and other survivors. Max Brooks opined that the zombie genre allows people to deal with their own anxiety about the end of the world. He commented, "People have a lot of anxiety about the future. They're constantly being battered with these very scary, very global catastrophes. I think a lot of people think the system is breaking down and just like the 1970s, people need a 'safe place' to explore their apocalyptic worries". Kim Paffenroth noted that "more than any other monster, zombies are fully and literally apocalyptic... they signal the end of the world as we have known it."

== Reception ==
Initial public reaction to the zombie apocalypse genre was immediately positive. When Night of the Living Dead premiered at the Fulton Theater in Pittsburgh on October 1, 1968, the film was an instant hit and was well received by movie goers in America and Europe. It received praise from Sight and Sound magazine in Britain and Cahiers du Cinéma in France. By contrast, critical reception was mainly negative. A reviewer for Variety commented that the film raised, "doubts about the future of the regional cinema movement and the moral health of filmgoers who cheerfully opt for unrelieved sadism." The graphic violence depicted in the film caused particular controversy. Pauline Kael writing for The New Yorker described it as, "one of the most gruesomely terrifying movies ever made". Roger Ebert wrote a review of the film for the Chicago Sun-Times, in which he commented on the reaction of the young audience: "I don't think the younger kids really knew what hit them. They'd seen horror movies before, but this was something else. This was ghouls eating people—you could actually see what they were eating. This was little girls killing their mothers. This was being set on fire. Worst of all, nobody got out alive—even the hero got killed". The film has since been recognised as a classic by film critics. In October 2018, Steve Rose writing for The Guardian described it as, "brilliantly perplexing, horrifying and mysteriously allegorical". Several decades after the release of Night of the Living Dead, the popularity of the genre has only increased. Films like 28 Days Later, Dawn of the Dead, Shaun of the Dead and Zombieland, as well as video games in the Resident Evil series and The Last of Us have been major commercial successes. In 2010, Frank Darabont, executive producer of The Walking Dead commented, "To be a fan of zombie films was a really sub-cult thing for many decades. In the last five years, it's become massively mainstream".

=== Genre controversy ===
The release of 28 Days Later in 2002 created a long-running debate over whether the film could be categorised within the genre of zombie apocalypse. This was based on the technicality that the people infected with rage from a virus in the film are still alive rather than returning from the grave. The debate was further fuelled by the director Danny Boyle choosing not to label the film as a zombie movie. Screenwriter Alex Garland finally settled the matter by stating, "Whatever technical discrepancies may or may not exist, they're pretty much zombies".

== In other media ==
=== Academic research ===
While aggressive quarantine may contain the epidemic, or a cure may lead to coexistence of humans and zombies, the most effective way to contain the rise of the undead is to hit hard and hit often.

— Philip Munz, Ioan Hudea, Joe Imad, and Robert J. Smith? [sic], "When Zombies Attack!" (2009)

According to a 2009 Carleton University and University of Ottawa epidemiological analysis, an outbreak of slow zombies "is likely to lead to the collapse of civilization, unless it is dealt with quickly." Based on mathematical modelling, the authors concluded that offensive strategies were the most reliable, due to risks that can compromise a quarantine. They also found that a cure would leave few humans alive, since this would do little to slow the infection rate. The study determined that the most likely long-term outcome of such an outbreak would be the extinction of humans. This conclusion stems from the study's reasoning that the primary epidemiological risk of zombies is the continual growth of the infected population, a phenomenon which would only cease with the infection or death of all surviving humans.

In 2017, a group of students from the University of Leicester Department of Physics and Astronomy used an epidemiological model called a SIRS model to plot the spread of a zombie infection. Their findings were presented in the Journal of Physics Special Topics. The study concluded that on the 100th day of the epidemic, only 273 human survivors would remain, outnumbered a million-to-one by the undead. A follow-up study using different parameters showed that the human population could recover.

=== Government ===
On May 18, 2011, the Centers for Disease Control and Prevention (CDC) published an article, Preparedness 101: Zombie Apocalypse providing tips on preparing to survive a zombie invasion. In a blog post, assistant surgeon general Ali S. Khan wrote, "That's right, I said z-o-m-b-i-e a-p-o-c-a-l-y-p-s-e. You may laugh now, but when it happens you'll be happy you read this". The post provided instructions for preparing for a zombie onslaught, as a comical way to prepare the public for similar emergencies, such as a hurricane or pandemic. CDC spokesman Dave Daigle said that the campaign was a response to a question about whether zombies were a potential danger due to radiation in Japan.

In the unclassified document titled "CONOP 8888", officers from U.S. Strategic Command used a zombie apocalypse scenario as a training template for operations, emergencies and catastrophes, as a tool to teach cadets about the basic concepts of military plans and disaster preparation using its admittedly outlandish premise.

=== Weather ===
On October 17, 2011, The Weather Channel published an article, "How to Weather the Zombie Apocalypse" that included a fictional interview with a director of research at the CDD, the "Center for Disease Development". The interview involved "Dr. Dale Dixon" answering questions about how different weather conditions affect zombies' abilities. Questions included "How does the temperature affect zombies' abilities? Do they run faster in warmer temperatures? Do they freeze if it gets too cold?"

== Influence and legacy ==
Donald Clarke writing for The Irish Times described Night of the Living Dead as one of the most influential horror films of all time. He commented, "Romero's dark fantasy dragged in many of the anxieties of its age. And, of course, it gave the horror world a new monster: a being that rises from the grave to feast on human flesh. They came to be known as zombies". Jon Towlson of the British Film Institute remarked that the ground-breaking legacy of the film lies in, "Romero making the zombies into flesh-eating beings, creating an allegory of a society devouring itself from within. This would become the central metaphor underlying much modern apocalyptic horror". Adam Nayman of The Ringer considered that the power of the zombie apocalypse movie is its plausibility. He said, "In Night of the Living Dead and Dawn of the Dead, Romero had smartly de-emphasized the why of his zombie outbreaks to focus on the physics (and metaphysics) of human survival: how the end of the world would bring out the best and worst in the human condition". Nicholas Barber from BBC Culture opined that, "zombies embody the great contemporary fear", noting their "relentless shuffle into the mainstream of popular culture" and particularly highlighted the commercial and critical success of films like 28 Days Later, Dawn of the Dead and Shaun of the Dead. Devon Maloney writing for Wired commented that zombie fandom shares a group mentality that has manifested in group activities like zombie walks, and that the concept of seeing a zombie as an "other" has been a complicated metaphor. He said, "The more realistic apocalypse scenarios in movies struggle to be, the more likely people are to consider them seriously". Kerrang!'s Mike Rampton wrote, "Perhaps the most appealing element of a zombie apocalypse is that it draws people together, forcing them to put their differences aside to unite against a common enemy and set it on fire. Other than the extraordinary violence involved, that sounds like a dream come true". Sophie Collins of MovieWeb considered that the appeal of the genre is that it is an escapist fantasy about survival: "Perhaps people underestimate what it takes to fight off a swarm of flesh-eating zombies, but almost everyone thinks they can handle it, and that's exactly what makes these movies so entertaining." In 2018, The Independent reported the findings of a survey conducted by NOW TV, which found that almost 25% of British people had a plan to survive a zombie apocalypse. The survey also found that one in six had considered putting in place a survival kit. Most respondents believed that the zombie apocalypse would begin in New York City and spread to London. It also found that one in ten respondents believed that they would only survive for one week in a post-apocalyptic world.

== Genre examples ==
=== Films ===
- Night of the Living Dead (1968), George A. Romero's first film in the Night of the Living Dead film series, spawned numerous other films in the genre. It follows a group of Pennsylvanians who barricade themselves in an old farmhouse to remain safe from a horde of flesh-eating ghouls.
- Dawn of the Dead (1978), Romero's follow-up film to Night of the Living Dead, depicts slow-moving zombies in a shopping mall as social commentary on consumerism.
- Zombi 2 (1979), an Italian film inspired by Night of the Living Dead and directed by Lucio Fulci, aimed to be its unofficial sequel. It centres on the fictional Caribbean island of Matul where a doctor is conducting research on the zombie reanimation. The film popularised zombie movies as an exploitation film genre in Italian cinema.
- Zombie Holocaust (1980), another Italian film set in a remote tropical location (the Maluku Islands). Zombie Holocaust featured cannibal tribes as well as zombies, combining the zombie genre with the cannibal film, another popular horror genre within Italian cinema.
- Nightmare City (1980), an Italian film directed by Umberto Lenzi, about a city overrun by violent zombies, caused by an infection originating from a nuclear disaster. The film was one of the first to feature agile, fast-moving zombies.
- Day of the Dead (1985) is a post-apocalyptic film directed by Romero in which survivors are forced to live underground after zombies have dominated the world.
- The Return of the Living Dead (1985), a comedy horror film directed by Dan O'Bannon, introduced several aspects of zombie film lore, including the concept of brain-eating zombies and the idea of zombie bites passing on the contagion. It centres on a bumbling pair of employees at a medical supply warehouse who accidentally release a deadly gas into the air causing the dead to re-animate.
- 28 Days Later (2002) is a British post-apocalyptic horror film written by Alex Garland and directed by Danny Boyle. It stars Cillian Murphy as a man who wakes from a coma to find a man-made "rage" virus has been unleashed in Britain. The film reinvented the genre with the concept of the running zombie.
- Resident Evil film series, starting in 2002, based on the video game series of the same name. These films involve a genetically engineered virus turning humans at a genetic research facility into flesh-eating zombies. In Resident Evil: Apocalypse (2004), the zombies and lore as conceptualized and choreographed by Sharon B. Moore and Derek Aasland advanced the genre by admixing the supernatural with the scientific. Moore and Aasland wrote an "Undead Bible" using script analysis and movement research to devise a "scientific logic" for the T-Virus, accounting for all zombie behaviour envisioned in Paul W. S. Anderson's script. The Undead Bible was used as the guide for the cast of nearly 1000 to ensure both a unified story logic and physicality.
- Dawn of the Dead (2004) is a remake of Romero's Dawn of the Dead directed by Zack Snyder in his directorial debut with a screenplay written by James Gunn. The film took the concept of survivors taking refuge in a shopping mall as an epidemic causes the infected to turn into flesh-eating zombies.
- Shaun of the Dead (2004), a comedy horror directed by Edgar Wright, is the first film in the Cornetto Trilogy. It stars Simon Pegg and Nick Frost who take refuge in a pub while Great Britain is under attack by zombies.
- Land of the Dead (2005) is a post-apocalyptic horror film directed by Romero in which survivors are ruled by a government that divides the rich from the poor.
- 28 Weeks Later (2007) is a sequel to 28 Days Later directed by Juan Carlos Fresnadillo and starring Robert Carlyle. It follows a father struggling to survive 28 weeks after the initial zombie epidemic.
- Planet Terror (2007), a film by Robert Rodriguez was released as part of the double-feature Grindhouse. The plot centres on a biochemical agent causing a worldwide zombie infection.
- Zombieland (2009) is a zombie comedy directed by Ruben Fleischer and starring Jesse Eisenberg. As the United States is ravaged by a zombie plague caused by a mutated form of mad cow disease, a small group attempts to survive while traveling across country to an amusement park in California.
- World War Z (2013), an action horror film based on the book of the same name, was directed by Marc Forster and stars Brad Pitt. The plot centres on the world being plagued by a mysterious infection turning whole human populations into rampaging mindless zombies.
- Train to Busan (2016) is a South Korean action horror film directed by Yeon Sang-ho. It takes place on a train to Busan, as a zombie apocalypse, caused by a leak from a biotech company, suddenly breaks out in the country and compromises the safety of the passengers.
- 28 Years Later (2025), Danny Boyle's long-term sequel to 28 Days Later and 28 Weeks Later. The film portrays a Britain populated almost exclusively by infected zombies, under permanent international quarantine, with small groups of uninfected survivors living in isolated communities, including Holy Island.

=== Comics ===
- The Deadworld comic series by Stuart Kerr and Ralph Griffith, which began in 1987.
- The 2001–2002 manga series Gyo by Junji Ito presents an unconventional take on the trope, in which Japan is overrun by an experimental species of bacteria, which constructs 'walking machines' to transport their infected 'power sources' and spread the disease. The bacteria initially infects marine life before later mutating to infect terrestrial organisms, including humans.
- The comic series The Walking Dead by Robert Kirkman, beginning in 2003, chronicles the story of survivors in a world overrun by zombies. The series was later adapted into a television series of the same name.
- The 2005 comic series Marvel Zombies and its sequels Marvel Zombies: Dead Days, Marvel Zombies vs. The Army of Darkness, Marvel Zombies 2, Marvel Zombies 3.
- The manga/anime series Highschool of the Dead, beginning in 2006, features a group of Japanese high school students caught in the middle of a zombie apocalypse.
- The 2019 DC Comics title DCeased has been cited as a variant of the zombie apocalypse, triggered by a new permutation of the Anti-Life Equation.

=== Literature ===
- The Zombie Survival Guide (2003) by Max Brooks details how one can survive various sized zombie outbreaks, including a world-wide outbreak that collapses civilization.
- Monster Island, Monster Nation and Monster Planet (2004–2004) by David Wellington.
- World War Z (2006) by Max Brooks which details humanity's efforts to defeat a worldwide zombie apocalypse.
- Pride and Prejudice and Zombies (2009) by Seth Grahame-Smith which combines Jane Austen's classic 1813 novel Pride and Prejudice with elements of modern zombie fiction.
- Warm Bodies (2010) by Isaac Marion is set in a zombie apocalypse but is told through the viewpoint of a zombie known only as R who regains his humanity after developing a relationship with a human girl that he spared.
- The Walking Dead: Rise of the Governor (2011) by Robert Kirkman and Jay Bonansinga is set within the universe of The Walking Dead comic books, which were also created and written by Kirkman. It follows one of the most villainous characters of the comics, Philip Blake, a.k.a. "The Governor", as he, two friends, his brother Brian and daughter Penny struggle to survive in a world where an undead plague has rendered the human race outnumbered.

=== Television ===
- Dead Set (2008) involves a zombie outbreak and the real television show Big Brother UK.
- The Walking Dead (2010–2022), based on the comic book series of the same name, and its spinoffs, Fear the Walking Dead and The Walking Dead: World Beyond.
- Z Nation (2014–2018), a zombie/horror/comedy focused around a man who becomes the only person to ever survive being bitten by a zombie. In the show, other survivors believe that he is the key to a cure for the zombie virus, known as the ZN1 virus.
- Black Summer (2019–2021): Six weeks after the start of the zombie apocalypse, Rose is separated from her daughter, Anna, and she embarks on a harrowing journey to find her.
- Kingdom (2019–2021): Set during the Joseon Dynasty in Korea, three years after the Japanese invasions. The story follows Crown Prince Lee Chang who, along with his subordinates, finds a zombie plague is ravaging the countryside amidst a brewing political conspiracy.
- All of Us Are Dead (2022–): A local South Korean high school is overrun by zombies, leaving trapped students with little left to survive. The series is based on a webtoon series of the same name by Joo Dong-geun.
- The Last of Us (2023–): An HBO adaptation based on the video game The Last of Us.

=== Video games ===
- Dead Nation: A shoot 'em up for the PlayStation Network.
- Dead Rising: A sandbox adventure game series in which the player character is usually trapped in a mall full of zombies and almost any object that can be found in the mall can be repurposed as an improvised weapon.
- Left 4 Dead and its sequel Left 4 Dead 2, a co-operative horror, first-person shooter where a rabies-like pathogen infects humanity.
- No More Room in Hell: A survival horror game set in a zombie apocalypse and featuring "Romero" zombies.
- Project Zomboid: An isometric RPG which aims for a degree of realism. It is being developed in a similar way to Minecraft.
- Resident Evil series, created by Capcom, made its debut in 1996 and developed into a multimedia franchise.
- The Last of Us: A third-person action adventure game known for its intricate storytelling and literary nature.
- The Walking Dead: A graphic adventure series based on the franchise. The games have been credited with rejuvenating the adventure game format.
- Urban Dead: A free to play HTML/text-based massively multiplayer online role-playing game.
- War of Rights: An American Civil War tactical first-person shooter. Starting in 2025, it features a time-limited event called "The Walking Dead". The event features Union and Confederate players join forces to survive waves of zombies, including large 'Titans' that require volley fire to take down.
- Zombie Apocalypse: Released as a downloadable title for the PlayStation Network and Xbox Live Arcade is a shoot 'em up title. The player takes control of four survivors and may fight against hordes of mutated zombies as a team, rescuing other survivors and investigating the cause of the infection.
- Zombie Panic: Features a human and a player-controlled zombie team fighting against each other in a zombie apocalypse.

=== Tabletop role-playing games ===
- All Flesh Must Be Eaten, a survival horror role-playing game (RPG) produced by Eden Studios, Inc.
- Dead Reign, published by Palladium Books, set in a world where zombies of various varieties dominate the planet

=== Music ===
- The zombie parody of The Beatles, the Zombeatles, began in 2006 with the song "Hard Day's Night of the Living Dead" and is set in a world where the zombies have eaten all the remaining humans.
- The 2008 Metallica music video for the song "All Nightmare Long" features the Soviet Union using a spore found after the Tunguska event on the United States to covertly create an army of zombies, and then openly destroying all of them, in order to take over the US.
- Metalcore band The Devil Wears Prada released their Zombie EP on August 24, 2010. The five song EP is about an impending zombie apocalypse, derived from lead vocalist Mike Hranica's strong interest in the subject.

== See also ==
- Zombie Squad, a non-profit charitable organization that uses an upcoming zombie apocalypse as its shtick.
