= David Wellington =

David Wellington may refer to:

- David Wellington (author) (born 1971), American author
- David Wellington (director) (born 1963), Canadian film director
- David Wellington (Homeland), fictional character
