= Monster Planet =

2005 novel by David Wellington

- First edition
- Author: David Wellington
- Language: English
- Series: David Wellington's Monster trilogy
- Genre: Horror
- Publisher: Thunder's Mouth Press
- Publication date: 2005
- Publication place: United States
- Media type: e-book
- ISBN: 978-1-905005-49-9
- OCLC: 190966714
- Preceded by: Monster Nation

disambiguation: may also refer to Godzilla: Monster Planet

Monster Planet (2005) is a horror novel by American writer David Wellington. It is the third and final novel in the author's Monster series of zombie apocalypse horror.

== Plot introduction ==
Monster Planet takes place twelve years after the events in Monster Island. Sarah, Dekalb's now 20-year-old daughter, fights alongside Ayaan and her squad of female Somali warriors to defend their last remaining settlements from the encroaching undead forces. Meanwhile, a powerful lich from Russia who calls himself "The Tsarevich" leads his army west on an unknown expedition.
