= Overwinter (novel) =

2010 horror novel by David Wellington

- First edition
- Author: David Wellington
- Cover artist: Kyle Kolker
- Language: English
- Genre: Horror
- Publisher: Three Rivers Press
- Publication date: September 14, 2010
- Publication place: United States
- Media type: paperback
- Pages: 352
- ISBN: 978-0-307-46079-0
- Preceded by: Frostbite

Overwinter (2010) is a horror novel by American writer David Wellington. It is the sequel to his previous werewolf novel Frostbite, though this novel is only available in print; it was not first published online like some of his other novels.

== Plot summary ==
The novel picks up shortly after the end of Frostbite following werewolves Cheyenne “Chey” Clark and Montgomery “Monty” Powell as they travel toward the Arctic Circle in search of a cure for the curse of lycanthropy that has afflicted them both. Along the way they are joined by Dzo, the personification of the Inuit muskrat spirit, and Lucie, the French werewolf who gave Monty the curse of lycanthropy. They are pursued by Varkanin, a Russian hunter who has blue skin from silver poisoning that renders him nearly-immune to werewolf attacks, who is in the employ of the Canadian government that wants the werewolves killed so they can sign an oil development agreement with a foreign energy company. The search for the cure to the werewolves' condition is complicated by Chey's gradual loss of her human identity to her increasingly wolf-like nature.

== Werewolves description ==
Werewolves in Overwinter have only two forms; human and lupine. They cannot control the change, and take on lupine form at any time that the moon is above the horizon, regardless of the moon's phase. The lupine form is similar to a normal wolf, but significantly stronger and more aggressive, bearing an intense hatred of humans. They have elements of the dire wolf, including unusually wicked teeth. Even in human form, the werewolf is notably stronger, faster and more resilient than a normal human of its physique.

Werewolves in either form have only a hazy recollection of events in their other form. Though the lupine form hates its own human form as much as (or more than) other humans, there is a slight mental connection, and the lupine form will often try to complete a task that the human form was engaged in when it changed. Still, some werewolves in human form are known to think of "their wolf" as a separate entity.

Unlike many representations of werewolves, one form does not "morph" into the other. Rather, it is as if the body becomes ephemeral and a new body is created, at every change. As a result, werewolves seem to be unaging, as a new perfect body (healed of injuries) is created for it at moonrise and moonset. Werewolves are also apparently immortal, as a dead werewolf (in either form) will return to life with the next change, unless silver is employed to kill it.

Silver is the nemesis of werewolves, as even a relatively light binding of silver chain cannot be broken by one. The effects of long-term contact with silver, or of silver weaponry, are not yet clear. It is known that contact with silver bindings in lupine form can leave a lasting mark when the werewolf regains human form.

== Reception ==
Wellington’s novel, like most of his other horror novels, earned largely positive reviews on horror review sites. In an upbeat appraisal The Horror Review called it “a fast-paced and highly original werewolf thriller”. The Bloodsprayer.com gave it similar praise calling the novel the “perfect follow up to Frostbite, with enough action and gore to entertain and keep that ‘horror’ edge”.
