= 23 Hours =

2009 novel by David Wellington

- cover to the novel
- Author: David Wellington
- Cover artist: Barbara Sturman
- Language: English
- Series: David Wellington's Vampire series
- Genre: Horror novel
- Publisher: Three Rivers Press
- Publication date: 2009
- Publication place: United States
- Media type: E-book & Print (Paperback)
- Pages: 305 pp
- ISBN: 978-0-307-45277-1
- OCLC: 264043828
- Preceded by: Vampire Zero
- Followed by: 32 Fangs

23 Hours is a 2009 vampire novel written by David Wellington. It is a sequel to 2008's Vampire Zero, and the fourth novel in the five book Laura Caxton Vampire series.

== Plot summary ==
Following her conviction at the end of Vampire Zero for stepping outside the law and torturing a convict for critical information she used to destroy her former mentor-turned-vampire, vampire hunter Laura Caxton is imprisoned in a maximum security penitentiary when it is invaded by Justinia Malvern, the world’s oldest vampire, intent on killing the former state police trooper. Malvern has used her vampiric skills to convert the prison's warden to her side, setting up the entire prison population to either accept her vampire's curse or become feeding stock for Malvern and her converts. Caxton must fight her way out of the prison and save her captured girlfriend, aided by her cellmate Gert, a meth addict who killed her children. Gert is killed during the subsequent riots, but she and Caxton are able to kill all the vampires in the prison. Although Fetlock- Caxton's replacement as head of the anti-vampire task force- believes that she has killed Justinia, Caxton goes on the run, realising that the whole crisis was set up to be just challenging enough to seem real, and that Malvern escaped during the day while the former warden- eye gouged out by Malvern to increase their resemblance- was ordered to act as her so that Caxton would believe Malvern to be dead...

== Reviews ==
Publishers Weekly said "Wellington's deadpan humor enlivens the satirical goth-gore proceedings as Laura battles the half-dead and their evil leader".
