= Vampire Zero =

2008 vampire novel written by David Wellington

- Author: David Wellington
- Cover artist: Barbara Sturman
- Language: English
- Series: David Wellington's Vampire series
- Genre: Horror novel
- Publisher: Three Rivers Press
- Publication date: 2008
- Publication place: United States
- Media type: E-book & Print (Paperback)
- Pages: 336 pp
- ISBN: 978-0-307-38172-9
- OCLC: 212856003
- Dewey Decimal: 813/.6 22
- LC Class: PS3623.E468 V36 2008
- Preceded by: 99 Coffins
- Followed by: 23 Hours

Vampire Zero is a 2008 vampire novel written by David Wellington.

== Plot summary ==
After Pennsylvania State Trooper and vampire hunter, Laura Caxton's former mentor James Arkeley willingly took on the vampire curse to battle against the regiment of undead Civil War-era soldiers when they were reanimated in Gettysburg, Pennsylvania, promising to come back and let Laura kill him. When Arkeley reneges on his promise, Caxton is forced to hunt down the now undead U.S. Marshal. Because Arkeley was the world's best vampire hunter, she finds it impossible to find any clues to his whereabouts. This is until a wannabe vampire, Dylan Carboy—a boy with an unhealthy obsession with Caxton and vampires—tries to kill her.

This chance encounter leads to a reunion of sorts at the Arkeley's memorial service with his estranged family: his wife: Astarte, his daughter: Raleigh, his son: Simon, and his brother: Angus. When Caxton starts questioning the family, she quickly discovers that Arkeley is intent on offering them the vampire's curse. His now-warped psychology seeing this as the best way to reconcile his human side's love for his family and his vampire side's loathing of them. When Astarte and Angus refuse the curse, Arkeley quickly dispatches them, leaving Simon and Raleigh. Taking his offspring into protective custody, Caxton is hindered by the Arkeleys’ family history, her new status as a deputized U.S. Marshal, and her new boss, Special Deputy Fetlock. She's pushed to her limits when Arkeley kills his former ally alongside mystic Vesta Polder before turning her into a half-dead. Caxton takes Carboy out of custody and tortures him- leaving him outside in a winter road with bare feet so that he will be forced to walk home and suffer from frostbite-, until he reveals enough of his hidden relationship with Arkeley for her to learn the location of his lair.

Caxton tracks the vampire to an abandoned coal mine in Centralia, Pennsylvania, a former company town all but turned into a ghost town from the underground coal fire started in the 1960s. There she is captured by Raleigh, who has accepted the vampire curse and been reanimated, and taken to Arkeley's den to be the first meal for Simon when he accepts the curse. Caxton is able to recapture her gun from Raleigh, shoot and kill the vampire, and escape into the depths of the burning coal mine. Pursued by Arkeley and his half-deads, Caxton kills most of the minions but is all but crippled by Arkeley's attack. Using her own blood as bait, Caxton lures the now blood-maddened Arkeley into a side-shaft of the mine and tricks him into falling down into the burning depths.

When Caxton finds her way back to the surface, carrying Simon, the only surviving member of the Arkeley family, she is immediately arrested by Fetlock for violating Carboy's constitutional rights.
