= 99 Coffins =

2007 novel by David Wellington

- Author: David Wellington
- Cover artist: Barbara Sturman
- Language: English
- Series: David Wellington's Vampire series
- Genre: Horror novel
- Published: 2007 (Three Rivers Press)
- Publication place: United States
- Media type: E-book & Print (Paperback)
- Pages: 307 pp
- ISBN: 0-307-38171-4
- OCLC: 153598502
- Dewey Decimal: 813/.6 22
- LC Class: PS3623.E468 A616 2007
- Preceded by: Thirteen Bullets
- Followed by: Vampire Zero

99 Coffins is a 2007 vampire novel written by David Wellington. It is a sequel to 2006's Thirteen Bullets.

== Plot ==
After having faced down vampires in the previous novel, Laura Caxton is more than happy to continue her career as a trooper in the Pennsylvania State Police. Her life is upended again when Special Agent United States Federal Marshal Jameson Arkeley contacts her to help investigate the discovery of a cache of Civil War-era coffins underneath the grounds of the Gettysburg Battlefield. There are one hundred coffins in the underground crypt along with ninety-nine hearts removed from the moldering vampire bodies, but one coffin is smashed and the vampire body is missing. Hobbled by his crippled hand, Arkeley presses Caxton into service as his field operative to hunt down the missing vampire body before another horrific outbreak of vampirism infects the local population.

In a series of flashbacks told through letters, journals, and military reports it is revealed that the 150-year-old vampires are the remains of a Union Army vampire corps that was used to turn the tide against the South at Gettysburg. Promised to be revived as human once a cure for vampirism was found, the soldiers were imprisoned in their tomb and were almost immediately forgotten by their commanders. The archeologist who discovers the tomb uses the vampires in a plot for his own personal gain.

With Arkeley crippled by injuries and age, he finally resolves that the best way to stop this new outbreak of vampirism is to allow himself to become one, having vampire Justina Malvern turn him so that he can defeat the awakened vampires himself. He informs Caxton that he will return to her so that she can kill him once he has completed his task, but fails to return once the sun rises, forcing Caxton to acknowledge that her mentor has become what he once hunted, leaving her resolved to find and stop him.

== Vampire nature in 99 Coffins ==
The vampires in David Wellington's novel lose all their human appearances once turned. Their ears become pointed, their hair falls out, all teeth become wickedly sharp, and skin color always becomes pale white, regardless of ethnicity and pigmentation in life. The vampire must remain in a coffin during the day, as their bodies literally die each sunrise, and flesh melts into a noxious fluid, with dead skin and maggots. They are put together when dusk comes, thus getting a new body at night. Physical damage, such as mangled ears, is repaired each morning, but atrophy due to blood-starvation is not.

The method of transferring the curse is very different from the "traditional" way. To transfer the curse one must accept the vampire's invitation to undeath, and then kill one's self to be reborn.

Vampires also have the power to resurrect their victims from the dead to create undead servants. These "half-deads" quickly decay, and thus have weak and fragile bodies. In one scene, Arkeley tells Caxton, that the half-deads are "cowards" and are very easily frightened, though they seem to stand their ground despite massive casualties in later encounters. In combat, they typically use knives and other hand-to-hand weapons, as their hand-eye coordination is too poor to properly use firearms.

Vampires are nearly unstoppable. They exhibit increased speed and vastly enhanced physical strength (enough to twist open a steel padlock using bare hands). As long as they have a supply of blood, they can heal grievous wounds, including massive brain injuries, in seconds. The only way to kill one is by destroying the heart, which is made extremely difficult because of the steel-hard nature of vampire skin. Arkeley uses a Glock 23 with cross-pointed bullets, which fragment within the target's body. It is suggested that a vampire with reserves of consumed blood in its body may be able to heal damage to its heart in time to prevent its death.

Unlike most traditional vampires, Wellington's vampires do age to a degree, with the result that their need for blood increases significantly as their body decays over time; the oldest vampire in the series, at over three centuries of age, has reached a point where she will allegedly require five to six gallons of blood just to walk on her own, with younger vampires taking on the responsibility of 'feeding' their elders by bringing them blood.

== Release details ==
99 Coffins was released by Random House Books on December 31, 2007.

== Critical commentary ==
In a mostly positive review, Publishers Weekly praised the book's fast pace and credibly created historical journal entries and letters. "The taut narrative never slackens, providing thrilling entertainment for readers who like their horror raw and bloody."
