= David Wellington (author) =

American writer of horror fiction (born 1971)

- Born: David Wellington; 1971 (age 54–55); Pittsburgh, Pennsylvania, U.S.
- Education: Syracuse University; Pennsylvania State University (MFA); Pratt Institute
- Occupation: Author
- Writing career
- Pen name: D. Nolan Clark
- Language: English
- Genre: Horror
- Notable work: Monster Island
- Website: davidwellington.net

David Wellington (born 1971) is an American writer of horror fiction, best known for his Zombie trilogy. He also writes science fiction as D. Nolan Clark.

== Biography ==
Wellington was born in Pittsburgh, Pennsylvania. He attended Syracuse University and received an MFA in creative writing from Penn State. He also holds a master's degree in Library Science from the Pratt Institute. He now lives in New York City.

He made his debut as a comic book writer on Marvel Zombies Return: Iron Man. His novel The Last Astronaut was nominated for the 2020 Arthur C. Clarke Award.

== Published works ==
=== Revenant-X ===
Revenant-X, the second book of the Red Space trilogy, begins exactly where Paradise-1 left off. The novel, which blends sci-fi horror and space adventure, follows the crew of Artemis on their search of a seemingly deserted Paradise-1 for what is left of the colony they are trying to save. However, the colony, or what remains of it, is not human. Revenant-X was released on November 5, 2024.

Revenant-X is in reference to one of the characters in the trilogy.

=== Paradise-1 ===
A blend of sci-fi and horror, Paradise-1 is the first novel in the Red Space trilogy about exploration and survival in deep space. In the novel, a police lieutenant who is tracking a serial killer finds that the suspect has kidnapped his victims and is keeping them imprisoned in a mining facility. After she calls in the arrest, her superior tells her to not report the discovery of the kidnapped victims, and she is reassigned to Paradise-1, a distant colony planet.

She is mystified by the order to not report on the kidnapping victims, who were filthy, hungry and unable to use language, and she perceives her reassignment to be a plan to get her out of sight.

Along with a doctor who was the only survivor from a different disease outbreak and a military pilot who was her former lover in college, she goes into cryosleep and embarks on the three-month trip in an unarmed transport ship. The humans are accompanied by a shape-shifting robot and an advanced AI module.

As the ship nears the planet, she is awakened from cryosleep by klaxons, as their ship is under attack from a nearby transport ship. As their ship is torn apart from projectiles, its communications and propulsion system becomes inoperable. Amidst the burning wreckage, the team sees that military vessels are converging on their ship. The team must improvise with the few remaining functions and tools to defend themselves and evade further attacks.

=== Monster trilogy ===
The Monster novels involve a global zombie apocalypse and describe how humanity has been reduced to tiny pockets of existence.

1. Monster Island
2. Monster Nation
3. Monster Planet

=== Vampire series ===
Wellington's vampire novels follow a Pennsylvania state trooper battling a centuries-old vampire.

1. 13 Bullets (2006 online serialization; 2007 print)
2. 99 Coffins (2007)
3. Vampire Zero (2008)
4. 23 Hours (2009)
5. 32 Fangs (published April 2012)

=== Werewolf series ===
Wellington's werewolf novels are set in remote Arctic Canada. The series follows werewolves who are being hunted to extinction by humans.

1. Frostbite was published on October 6, 2009. The web serialization can be found at Wellington's website.
2. Overwinter was released on September 14, 2010.

=== Plague Zone ===
Plague Zone is a zombie novel set in the state of Washington. It is completed in serial online, but not yet published in print. (Online serialization. Went to Kindle September 2012)

=== Jim Chapel missions ===
- Chimera (2013)
- "Minotaur" (2013 e-book)
- "Myrmidon" (2013 e-book)
- The Hydra Protocol (2014)
- The Cyclops Initiative (2016)

=== The Silence trilogy (as D. Nolan Clark) ===
The first novel, Forsaken Skies, was reviewed by Kirkus Reviews as containing "the usual complications, heroics, and surprises (...), all professionally packaged and produced and entirely unmemorable".

1. Forsaken Skies (2016), ISBN 978-0-316-35569-8
2. Forgotten Worlds (2017), ISBN 978-0-316-35577-3
3. Forbidden Suns (2017), ISBN 978-0-316-35581-0

=== Other novels ===
- The Last Astronaut (2019), ISBN 978-0-356-51229-7

=== Short stories ===
1. "Chuy and the Fish" in The Undead: Zombie Anthology (Oct. 2005, Permuted Press)
2. "Cyclopean" in The Undead: Skin and Bones (Aug. 2007, Permuted Press)
3. "Twilight in the Green Zone" in Exotic Gothic (2007, Ash-Tree Press, ed. Danel Olson). Click for Podcast by author.
4. "Grvnice" in Exotic Gothic 2 (2008, Ash-Tree Press, ed. Danel Olson).
5. "Off Radio" in Buried Tales of Pinebox, TX (June 2009, 12 to Midnight)
6. "Atacama" in Exotic Gothic 4 (May 2012, PS Publishing, ed. Danel Olson)
7. "The Man With The Fractal Tattoo", Whose Future is It?, chapter 3 (2018)
8. "The Passenger", Whose Future is It?, chapter 11 (2018)
