= 13 Bullets =

2006 novel by David Wellington

- First print edition
- Author: David Wellington
- Cover artist: Barbara Sturman
- Language: English
- Series: David Wellington's Vampire series
- Genre: Horror
- Publisher: brokentype (online); Three Rivers Press (print)
- Publication date: August 2006 (online)
- Publication place: United States
- Media type: ebook
- Pages: 336
- ISBN: 0-307-38143-9
- OCLC: 76166945
- Dewey Decimal: 813/.6 22
- LC Class: PS3623.E468 A613 2007
- Followed by: 99 Coffins

13 Bullets is a vampire novel by David Wellington, published in serial online in March, 2006.

== Plot introduction ==
13 Bullets takes place in Pennsylvania in the year 2003, in a setting similar to the real world, but where vampires and other supernatural forces are rare but accepted phenomena. It is widely believed that vampires were all but wiped out twenty years ago by Special Deputy Jameson Arkeley. The last vampire still in existence, Justinia Malvern, long imprisoned in a nearly abandoned sanitarium, has somehow managed to bestow her vampiric curse to the outside world and is working to free herself of human confinement. Pennsylvania State Trooper Laura Caxton is assigned to assist Arkeley hunt down the vampires running loose in rural Pennsylvania.

== Vampire nature in 13 Bullets ==
The vampires in David Wellington's novel seem to lose all their human appearances once turned. Their ears become pointed, their hair falls out, all teeth become wickedly sharp, and skin color always becomes pale white, regardless of ethnicity and pigmentation in life. The vampire must remain in a coffin during the day, as their bodies literally die each sunrise, and flesh melts into a noxious fluid, with dead skin and maggots. They are put together when dusk comes, thus getting a new body at night. Physical damage, such as mangled ears, is repaired each morning, but atrophy due to blood-starvation is not.

The method of transferring the curse is very different from the "traditional" way. To transfer the curse one must accept the vampire's invitation to undeath, and then kill one's self to be reborn.

Vampires also have the power to resurrect their victims from the dead to create undead servants. These "half-deads" quickly decay, and thus have weak and fragile bodies. In one scene, Arkeley tells Caxton, that the half-deads are "cowards" and are very easily frightened, though they seem to stand their ground despite massive casualties in later encounters. In combat, they typically use knives and other hand-to-hand weapons, as their hand-eye coordination is too poor to properly use firearms.

Vampires are nearly unstoppable. They exhibit increased speed and vastly enhanced physical strength (enough to twist open a steel padlock using bare hands). As long as they have a supply of blood, they can heal grievous wounds, including massive brain injuries, in seconds. The only way to kill one is by destroying the heart, which is protected by an area of steel-hard skin. The vampire is weakest when it regurgitates blood - usually to feed another vampire - and can potentially be killed with a single shot at this moment. Arkeley himself uses a Glock .23 with cross-pointed bullets, which fragment within the target's body. It is suggested that a vampire with reserves of consumed blood in its body may be able to heal damage to its heart in time to prevent its death.

Unlike most traditional vampires, Wellington's vampires do age to a degree, with the result that their need for blood increases significantly as their body decays over time; the oldest vampire in the series, at over three centuries of age, has reached a point where she will allegedly require five to six gallons of blood just to walk on her own, with younger vampires taking on the responsibility of 'feeding' their elders by bringing them blood.

== Release details ==
13 Bullets was printed in book form in 2007 by Three Rivers Press.

== Reception ==
13 Bullets has gathered mostly positive reviews from horror fans. Flamesrising.com called the novel a “modern action adventure with deadly vampires, great writing and a few clever plot twists”. Revish stated that Wellington's work was “a worthy addition to an overcrowded genre”.
