= Robert Pestronk =

American health officer

Robert M. (Bobby) Pestronk is an American public health officer. On May 8, 2023, he was elected as a council member for the Village of Friendship Heights, Maryland, US. On May 15, 2023, he was elected chairman of the council. Council offices are located at the Friendship Heights Village Center, 4433 South Park Avenue, Chevy Chase, Maryland. Mr. Pestronk's term as council member and council chairman ended on May 19, 2025.

Bobby also serves as a trustee emeritus for the Ruth Mott Foundation, a charitable private philanthropy in Flint, Michigan, which advocates, stimulates, and supports community vitality in North Flint through grant making in the areas of youth, public safety, economic opportunity, and neighborhoods as well as the public use of Applewood, the former home of C.S. Mott's family, and for the family's archives.

== Career ==
Bobby is the former executive director and a past president of the National Association of County and City Health Officials (NACCHO) in Washington, DC serving from 2006-2014. NACCHO provides programs and services to represent and support America's 2600 local health departments. As the former health officer for Genesee County, Michigan, Pestronk enabled Genesee County's 430,000 citizens to protect, promote, and improve their health and quality of life in partnership with community resources.

As the director of the Genesee County Health Department from 1986–2008, he administered clinical, regulatory, and other human service programs in the areas of personal, community, behavioral, and environmental health. His leadership and novel partnerships helped establish the Genesee Health Plan, the Greater Flint Health Coalition, some of Michigan's earliest local regulations to prevent exposure to tobacco smoke and products, and to reduce African-American infant death. Prior to his tenure as a local health department director appointed by the Genesee County Board of Commissioners, he served as a consultant and administrator for statewide maternal and child health programs at the Michigan Department of Public Health.

Pestronk is a past board member of the Michigan Health Officers Association (of which he is a past president) and served on the Board of the Michigan Association for Local Public Health. He is a Primary Care Policy Fellow through the United States Department of Health and Human Services and trained as a scholar through the Public Health Leadership Institute. He is past president of the Primary Care Fellowship Society and past president of the Public Health Leadership Society Council. He was a member of the Institute of Medicine Public Health Roundtable and of the National Advisory Committee for Turning Point: Collaborating for a New Century of Public Health. He was the first president of the Public Health Law Association. Pestronk received the John H. Romani Outstanding Alumni Award from the University of Michigan School of Public Health Department of Public Health Policy and Administration and was presented the Distinguished Alumnus Award by the University of Michigan School of Public Health.

Pestronk is the founder of PestronkGlass.com.

== Writing ==
Pestronk's published work includes articles in the Journal of Public Health Management and Practice, the Journal of Law, Medicine & Ethics, the Journal of the American Public Health Association, Health Education and Behavior, Public Health Reports, NACCHO Exchange and the Journal of the American Academy of Nurse Practitioners. Chapters in books include those published by the American Public Health Association and Oxford University Press.

== Publication List ==
- Leep CJ, Newman SJ, Pestronk RM and Wohlfeld I, The Local Health Department. In: Erwin PC and Brownson RC, eds. Scutchfield and Keck's Principles of Public Health Practice. 4th edition. Clifton Park, NY: Cengage Learning. In press, 2015
- Pestronk, RM, Local Health Departments and Primary Care Safety Nets. In: Michener JL et al., eds. The Practical Playbook, Public Health and Primary Care Together. New York NY: Oxford University Press, 2015
- Etkind P, R Gehring, J Ye, A Kitlas, R Pestronk, J Public Health Management Practice, 2014, 20(4), 456-458.
- Executive Director's Column (Health Equity), NACCHO Exchange, 13(1), Winter 2014, 12-13.
- Pestronk RM et al., Accreditation on Target, J Public Health Management Practice, 2014, 20(1), 152-155.
- Executive Director's Column (Model Practices), NACCHO Exchange, 12(4), Fall 2013, 12-13.
- Executive Director's Column (Public Health Law), NACCHO Exchange, 12(3), Summer 2013, 12-13.
- Schneider, JK, RM Pestronk, PE Jarris, Ramping Up Policy Measures in the Area of Physical Activity, J Public Health Management Practice, 2013, May/June, 19(3) E-Supp, S4-S7.
- Executive Director's Column (SACCHOs), NACCHO Exchange, 12(2), Spring 2013, 10-11.
- Executive Director's Column (ePublic Health), NACCHO Exchange, 12(1), Winter 2013, 12-13.
- Pestronk RM, JJ Elligers, B Laymon, Public Health's Role: Collaborating for Healthy Communities, Health Progress (www.chausa.org), January–February 2013.
- Jarris PE, JA Monroe, RM Pestronk, Better Health Requires Partnerships and a Systems Approach, American Journal of Public Health, November 2012, 102(11), e4.
- Executive Director's Column (Model Practices), NACCHO Exchange, 11(4), Fall 2012, 10-11.
- Executive Director's Column (Climate Change and Public Health), NACCHO Exchange, 11(3), Summer 2012, 10-11.
- Executive Director's Column (Communicating the Value of Local Health Departments), NACCHO Exchange, 11(2), Spring 2012, 12-13.
- Executive Director's Column (Evidence-Based Practice in Public Health), NACCHO Exchange, 11(1), Winter 2012, 12-13.
- Executive Director's Column (Model Practices), NACCHO Exchange, 10(4), Fall 2011, 10-11.
- Executive Director's Column (Accreditation), NACCHO Exchange, 10(3), Summer 2011, 8-9.
- Executive Director's Column (Preventing Chronic Disease), NACCHO Exchange, 10(2), Spring 2011, 8-9.
- Executive Director's Column (Immunization and Infectious Disease), NACCHO Exchange, 10(1), Winter 2011, 8-9.
- Executive Director's Column (Model Practices), NACCHO Exchange, 9(4), Fall 2010, 8-9.
- Executive Director's Column (Emerging Public Health Opportunities), NACCHO Exchange, 9(3), Summer 2010, 12-13.
- Pestronk RM, Using metrics to improve population health, Preventing Chronic Disease, 2010; 7(4). http://www.cdc.gov/pcd/issues/2010/jul/10_0018.htm. Accessed Jun 17, 2010.
- Executive Director's Column (H1N1 Community Preparedness), NACCHO Exchange, 9(2), Spring 2010, 14.
- Executive Director's Column (Advancing Health Equity), NACCHO Exchange, 9(1), Winter 2010, 17.
- Beitsch LM, C Leep, G Shah, RG Brooks, RM Pestronk, “Quality Improvement in Local Health Departments: Results of the NACCHO 2008 Survey,” in J Public Health Management and Practice, January–February 2010, 16(1), 49-54.
- Achieving a Culture of Quality Improvement: The Vision for Public Health in 2026”, MM Fallon, PE Jarris, RM Pestronk, HS Smith, PG Russo, in J Public Health Management and Practice, January–February 2010, 16(1), 3-4.
- Executive Director's Column (Model Practices), NACCHO Exchange, 8(4), Fall 2009, 9.
- Executive Director's Column (Leadership and Workforce Development), NACCHO Exchange 8(3), Summer 2009, 12.
- Executive Director's Column (International Public Health), NACCHO Exchange, 8(2), Spring 2009, 11.
- Ethics and Governmental Public Health Practice,” RM Pestronk and PD Jacobson, J Public Health Management and Practice, 14(4), July–August 2008, 327-8.
- President's Column (Informatics), NACCHO Exchange, 7(2), Spring 2008, 10-11.
- President's Column (Health equity), NACCHO Exchange, 7(1), Winter 2008, 6-7.
- Improving Laws and Legal Authorities for Public Health Emergency Legal Preparedness”, Pestronk Robert M., B. Kamoie et al., in Journal of Law, Medicine and Ethics, Special Supplement to Volume 36:1, Spring 2008, The National Action Agenda for Public Health Legal Preparedness, ed. M. Ransom, 47-51 accessed on January 18, 2008 (http://www.aslme.org/cdc/pestronk.pdf).
- Assessing Laws and Legal Authorities for Public Health Emergency Legal Preparedness”, Brian Kamoie, RM Pestronk et al., in Journal of Law, Medicine and Ethics, Special Supplement to Volume 36:1, Spring 2008, The National Action Agenda for Public Health Legal Preparedness, ed. M. Ransom, 23-27 accessed on January 18, 2008 (http://www.aslme.org/cdc/kamoie.pdf).
- President's Column (Model Practices), NACCHO Exchange, 6(4), Fall 2007, 6-7.
- President's Column (Improving Health Outcomes), NACCHO Exchange, 6(3), Summer 2007, 8-9.
- Public Health Connection: Q & A with the Public Health Workforce”, NACCHO Exchange, (6)1 Winter 2007, 22-23.
- Why Just Prepare for Emergencies When Full Use Is Possible”, Pestronk Robert M, J Public Health Management and Practice, 11(4) July–August 2005, 298-300.
- Public Health in Court: Who's to Judge?”, Pestronk Robert M. et al., J Law, Medicine & Ethics, Special Supplement, 32(4) Winter 2004: 47-49.
- Flint Photovoice: Community Building Among Youths, Adults, and Policymakers”, Wong, Caroline C., S. Morrel-Samuels, P.M. Hutchison, L. Bell, R. M. Pestronk, American Journal of Public Health, 94 (6) June 2004, 911-913.
- The Public Health Law Association: A New Partnership in Public Health Practice”, Pestronk, Robert M., Cynthia Honsinger and Montrece Ransom, J Law, Medicine and Ethics, Winter, 31:4, 2003, 714-715.
- A Partnership to Reduce African American Infant Mortality in Genesee County, Michigan”, Pestronk, Robert M. and Marcia Franks, Public Health Reports, 118(4), July/August 2003, 324-335.
- Considerations for Special Populations" in Law in Public Health Practice, Stone TH, Horton HH, Pestronk Robert M., ed. Richard A. Goodman et al., Oxford University Press, 2003, 211-241.
- Protecting Our Vulnerable Food Supply", Pestronk, Robert M. et al., J Law, Medicine & Ethics, Special Supplement, 30 (3) Fall 2002: 96-104.
- Working on Workforce: An Update on NACCHO's Workforce and Leadership Development Advisory Committee", Robert M. Pestronk, NACCHO Exchange, Fall 2002, 1(3), 13, 15.
- Racial and Ethnic Approaches to Community Health (REACH 2010)", Practice Notes: Strategies in Health Education, Health Education and Behavior, June 2002, 29(3), 281-282.
- Planting a Seed", Pestronk, Robert M., J Public Health Management and Practice, 2002, 8(1), 36-38.
- Community-Based Practice in Public Health, Pestronk, Robert M., in Community-Based Public Health: A Partnership Model, ed. TA Bruce and SU McKane, American Public Health Association, 2000, pp. 71–82.
- A View from Here”, Pestronk, Robert M., Leadership in Public Health, the University of Chicago, Volume 4, Number 4, Spring 1999.
- Selig S. and R. Pestronk, “Working Toward Community-Based Public Health: the Experience of Flint, Michigan”, The Link, Vol. 7 (Winter, 1995). pp. 1 and 6.
- Blueprint for a Healthy Community: A Guide for Local Health Departments, July 1994, Cooperative Agreement V50/CCU 302718-07, CDC/NACHO, Committee Member/Contributor.
- Working Toward the Vision of Community-Based Public Health; a collaboration between the Genesee County Health Department and the University of Michigan, Selig, Suzanne and
- Managed Outcomes: A Strategy to Improve the Nation's Health, Pestronk, Robert M., et al. J American Academy of Nurse Practitioners, Vol. 6, # 3, March 1994.
- Using Racial Tensions to Strengthen Coalitions and Promote Primary Care Services in an Economically Depressed Community, S. Selig, A. Brown, R. Brown, R. Pestronk, presented paper, Annual Meeting of American Public Health Association, 1993.
- What You Should Get For Your Health Care Dollars, Pestronk, Robert M., The Flint Journal, November 21, 1993.
- Managed Outcomes: A Paradigm Shift to Improve Our Nation's Health, Pestronk, Robert M., Primary Care Policy Fellowship paper, June 1993.
- Proving Your Worth...Evaluation in Dietetics, Pestronk, Robert; Anderson, J.; Larkin, F.; Thompson, F.; and Wong, F., Michigan Dietetic Association, 1984.
- Reasons for Enrollment in the Michigan WIC Program, May 1980 - April 1981. Pestronk, Robert; USDA Grant 59-3198-9-78, October 1981.
- A Review of Issues in Nutrition Program Evaluation, Sahn, David; Pestronk, Robert M., Office of Nutrition and Office of Education, U.S. Agency for International Development, July 1981.
- Experiences and Methodologies in Nutrition Program Evaluation - A Literature Review, Sahn, David; Pestronk, Robert M. (AID/SOC/C-0082 WO-5), October 1979.

== Presentations ==
- Local health departments in public health context and present day challenges”, Oklahoma City County Health Department, June 15, 2015.
- Context, change, and a longer view”, 2014 North Carolina State Health Director's Conference, Raleigh, NC, January 23, 2014.
- Who will protect, promote, secure, and Improve the health of our communities?”, New York Academy of Medicine, September 20, 2013.
- ePublic Health”, Tennessee Public Health Association, Franklin, TN, September 13, 2013
- Local Health Departments...What's Up Nationally?”, Florida Public Health Association, Orlando, FL, August 30, 2013.
- Clinical-Community Relationships as a Pathway to Improve Health: Tools for Research and Evaluation” (webinar), Agency for Healthcare Research and Quality, August 7, 2013.
- Excellence in Local Public Health Department Law”, Aspen Institute, Glen Cove, NY, August 6, 2013.
- What do local health officials want from researchers?” (webinar), University of Kentucky National Coordinating Center for Public Health Systems and Services Research, July 17, 2013.
- Context, change, and a longer view,” North Carolina Public Health Association, Raleigh, North Carolina, June 18, 2013
- The Affordable Care Act-Implications for Local Public Health, Montgomery County (MD) Commission on Health, October 18, 2012.
- A New Public Health? Healthier People in the 20 teens context”, Wyoming Public Health Association, Casper, WY, October 4, 2012.
- It's ACAdemic and epidemic”, Association of Public Health Laboratories, Omaha, NE, June 5, 2011.
- Public Health and Law at the Local Level”, Institute of Medicine, Washington, DC, May 18, 2010.
- Recession as Opportunity”, Grantmakers in Health, phone conference, December 17, 2009
- Sources, Uses, and Losses: Funding for Local Health Departments Nationwide”, Institute of Medicine, Washington, DC, November 3, 2009
- Scoring a run by hitting singles”, Missouri Association of Local Public Health, Columbia MO, September 25, 2009; Public Health in the Rockies, Copper Mountain CO, September 28, 2009; Association of Ohio Health Commissioners, Columbus OH, September 30, 2009; New York State Association of County and City Health Officials, October 2, 2009, Rome NY
- Making US a Healthier Nation”, National Business Coalition on Health Leadership Council, Memphis, TN, June 26, 2009.
- NACCHO and local health departments”, Iowa Public Health Week conference, Ames IA, April 6, 2009
- Partners in response to pandemic influenza: local health and police departments”, Michigan Association of Chiefs of Police, Grand Rapids, MI, February 7, 2008.
- Quality Improvement at the Genesee County Health Department”, National Public Health Leadership Institute (Webcast), November 15, 2007.
- Pursuing Equity in Public Health”, Association of State and Territorial Health Officials, St. Louis MO, October 2007.
- Shared Visions---Federal, State and Local Collaboration toward Healthier Generations”, Association of State and Territorial Health Officials, St. Louis MO, October 2007.
- Pandemic Influenza: Could History Repeat Itself?”, University of Michigan School of Public Health, Michigan Center for Public Health Preparedness and Michigan Department of Public Health, Reactor Panel: Influenza Planning: Local, State and Federal Interactions, Ann Arbor MI, January 2005.
- Adopting and implementing new policies: procedures and challenges”, University of Michigan School of Public Health/Department of Health Management and Policy, November 2004.
- Attorneys and Health Officers”, Third Annual Partnership Conference on Public Health Law, American Society of Law, Medicine & Ethics/Centers for Disease Control and Prevention, Atlanta GA, June 2004.
- Roles and Responsibilities”, University of Michigan-Flint, Flint MI, June 2004
- Genesee County's Regulation to Prohibit Smoking in Enclosed Places”, Tobacco-Free Michigan, Lansing, MI January 2004.
- Attorneys and Health Officers”, County Emergency Preparedness and Liability: What is the Law, Indiana Continuing Legal Education Forum, Indianapolis IN, August 2003.
- Legal Lessons from the Monkeypox Outbreak”, Teleconference Moderator, Public Health Law Association, Centers for Disease Control and Prevention, July 2003.
- Community Infection Control: Lessons from SARS”, Teleconference Moderator, Public Health Law Ass0ociation, Centers for Disease Control and Prevention, April 2003.
- Bioterrorism Preparedness: Local Public Role and Function, Bioterrorism and Emergency Preparedness at State and Local Perspective: Michigan Academic Center for Public Health Preparedness, University of Michigan Bioterrorism Preparedness Initiative, East Lansing, Michigan, March, 2003.
- Preparedness for bioterrorism: roles for your local health department and the clergy”, The Role of the Faith Community on County Wide Disaster Preparedness, Flint, Michigan, March 2003.
- Invited testimony, Michigan House of Representatives, Health Policy Committee, February 2003.
- Bioterrorism planning...Where do you begin?", 2002 Summit, New Challenges...A New Tomorrow, Michigan State Police, Michigan Emergency Management Association, Crystal Mountain, Michigan, October 2002.
- Health Officers and Legal Counsel: Partners in Prevention", The Public's Health and the Law in the 21st Century, Atlanta, GA, June 2002.
- Program: Racial and Ethnic Approaches to Community Health (REACH 2010) in Practice Notes: Strategies in Health Education, Health Behavior, Sage Publications, 29(3) June 2002: 281-282.
- Better Life Through Better Health”, First Presbyterian Church, Flint, MI May, 2002.
- Do Babies of African Descent Have to Die at a Rate Three Times Higher Than Other Babies?", Public Health Students of African Descent Minority Health Conference, Ann Arbor, MI, March 2002.
- Reducing African-American Infant Mortality", Robert Pestronk, Resolving Disparities in Infant Mortality – A Michigan Statewide Summit, Detroit, MI, December 2001.
- Yes, We Can (and are)!", Robert Pestronk, Breakfast of Champions, Region 9, Governor's Council on Physical Fitness, Burton, MI, November 2001.
- Michigan Fights Back: Business Forum for Area Business", Chamber of Commerce, Robert Pestronk, Flint, MI, November 2001.
- "REACH 2010: Working Locally, Thinking Globally": Live Satellite Broadcast, American Public Health Association, Robert Pestronk, Reducing African-American Infant Mortality Rates, Atlanta, GA, October 2001.
- The REACH (Racial and Ethnic Approaches to Community Health) Program”, Letitia Presley-Cantrell, Robert Pestronk, Ella Green-Moten, SIDS Alliance, Chicago, IL, April 2001.
- Genesee County REACH 2010: Reducing Infant Mortality, Successfully Engaging Faith Communities", Pestronk, Robert M., American Public Health Association Annual Meeting, Boston, MA, November 14, 2000.
- Plotting a Course: one local department's experience", Pestronk, Robert M., Public Health and the Law: Where Does the Attorney-Client Team Go From Here?, NACCHO\ASTHO Annual Meeting, Los Angeles, CA, July 2000.
- Contributor/Participant, Eliminating Health Disparities: A Practice Based Review, Public Health Leadership Society Thinktank, Center for Health Leadership, October 1999.
- The Law and a Local Health Department”, Public Health Law and Policy Workshop, Centers for Disease Control and Prevention, Atlanta, GA, September, 1999.
- It's Not the Reorganization”, Joint Public Health Conference, Georgia Department of Human Resources, Atlanta, GA, April 1999.
- It's Not the Reorganization”, Reorganizing and Restructuring: The Changing Face of Public Health, National Association of County and City Health Officials/Association of State and Territorial Health Officials Conference, St. Louis, MO, September 1998.
- Changing Role of Public Health”, Pew Health Policy Program: Lessons and Legacy Meeting, San Francisco, CA, June 9, 1997.
- Hepatitis A and Strawberries, Invited Testimony before the U.S. House of Representatives, Committee on Education and the Workforce Subcommittee on Children, Youth, and Families, April 17, 1997.
- Broadening the Focus: Quality-Related Initiatives to Improve Community Health Status, AHCPR User Liaison Program: Ensuring Quality Health Care: The Challenges of Measuring, Performance and Consumer Satisfaction, Philadelphia, PA, September 1996.
- Commentary”, Working with Communities to Identify Problems and Create Solutions, Defining Community Reexamining Society, University of Michigan-Flint, MI, September 1996.
- Improving the Public's Health: Collaboration between Public Health Departments and Managed Care Organizations, Wendy Knight, Joint Council of Governmental Agencies, Workgroup on Access, Assurance and Reimbursement for Primary Care, Work Group Member, 1996.
- Reactor Panel Member, Sharing Responsibility, Sharing Assets: Community Institutional Partnerships for Healthy Communities, National Association of County and City Health Officials Annual Conference, Seattle, WA, June 1996.
- Alternative Futures for the Public's Health: A National Workshop, Fort Worth, TX, April 1996.
- New Roles for Local Health Departments”, 1995 Biennial Institute, Department of Health Services Management and Policy, University of Michigan School of Public Health, Ypsilanti, MI, September 1995.
- Visioning Public Health, Consultant, Robert Woods Johnson Foundation, September 1995.
- Changing Roles of Public Health Systems Under Managed Care”, Presenter, Teleconference, Public Health Foundation, August 1995.
- Moderator, Building Partnerships for Medicaid Managed Care Arrangements, NACCHO Annual Meeting Conference, Atlanta, July 1995.
- Community - Based Public Health: An Assets Based Approach to Improving Community Health”, Pestronk, Robert M., Prevention 95, New Orleans, LA, April 1995.
- Reactor Panel Member, “Public Health and Health Care Reform”, Public Health Leadership Society Annual Meeting Program, October 1994.
- Legislative Panel...The How To's (Tobacco Control Regulations in Genesee County)”, Pestronk, Robert M., presentation, Great Lakes Chapter, Society for Public Health Education Annual Conference, October 1994.
- Panelist, “The CDC Public Health Leadership Institute”, Pestronk, Robert M., Michigan Association for Local Public Health Annual Meeting, August 1994.
- Pestronk, Robert M., National Association of County Health Officials Annual Meeting, 1994 (abstract).
- Using an Assets-Based Approach to Improve Community Health”, Pestronk, Robert M., presented paper to National Association of County Health Officials Annual Meeting, July 1994.
- The New Health Department: Implications of Managed Care”, Pestronk, Robert M., Annual Meeting: Community Based Public Health Initiatives, Baltimore, MD., June 1994.
- Invited Testimony, Michigan Senate Appropriations Subcommittee on Public Health, February 17, 1994.
- The Future for Local Health Departments After Health Care Reform”, Pestronk, Robert M. Public Health Leadership Institute, January 1994.
- Towards a Richer Understanding of the Multi Disciplinary Puzzle”, Pestronk, Robert M.; Keynote Address; AMSA Region IV Fall 1993 Conference, October 2, 1993.
- Local Health Department - Hospital Collaboration, Michigan Association for Local Public Health Annual Meeting, 1993.
- The Detroit-Genesee County-University of Michigan Community Based Consortium, Barbara A. Israel, Dr. PH, Beverly Creigs, Ph.D., Robert M. Pestronk, M.P.H., Barry Checkoway, Ph.D., Toby Citrin, J.D.; APHA Annual Meeting, November 1992.
- Congressional Field Hearing on Health Care; Congressman Dale E. Kildee, Invited Testimony, January 8, 1992.
- Research Assistant, Community Nutrition in Preventive Health Care Services, Owen, Anita (DHEW HRP-030070), 1978.

== Service Activities ==
- Reviewer, The National Academies of Sciences, Engineering, and Medicine, Making Eye Health a Population Health Imperative, 2016
- Member, Advisory Committee, Excellence in State Public Health Law, Aspen Institute, 2013 - 2014
- Member, Health Disparities Subcommittee, Advisory Committee to the Director (CDC), 2012 - 2015
- Member, Expert Panel for Clinical-Community Relationships Measures, Agency for Healthcare Research and Quality, 2012 - 2013
- Member, Steering Committee for Population Health, National Quality Forum, 2011 – 2013
- Member, Advisory Group, Roadmaps to Health Prize, University of Wisconsin Population Health Institute/Robert Wood Johnson Foundation, 2011 -2013.
- Member, Planning Committee, Health Data Initiative Forum, U. S. Department of Health and Human Services and Institute of Medicine, 2010 – 2011.
- Member, Board of Directors, Ruth Mott Foundation, 2010-
- Member, Board of Directors, Alliance for the Healthiest Nation, 2008 – 2013
- Member, Board of Directors, NARSAD, 2006-2009
- Member, Board of Directors, Public Health Accreditation Board, 2008 - 2015
- Past President, National Association of County and City Health Officials, 2008
- President-Elect, Rotary Club of Flint, 2008 - 2009
- Member, Board of Directors, Priority Children, 2008 - 2009
- President, National Association of County and City Health Officials, 2007 - 2008
- Board Member, Griffith Leadership Center, University of Michigan School of Public Health, 2007- 2008
- Member, Practice Advisory Council, University of Michigan School of Public Health, 2007
- President-Elect, National Association of County and City Health Officials, 2006 - 2007
- Member, Nominations Committee, Public Health Law Association, 2006.
- Member, Advisory Board, University of Michigan Center for Law, Ethics, and Health, 2005 - 2007
- Member, Steering Committee, Exploring Accreditation, Robert Wood Johnson Foundation and Centers for Disease Control and Prevention, 2005 – 2006.
- Vice President, National Association of County and City Health Officials, 2005 - 2006.
- Chair, NACCHO Committee Restructuring Workgroup, 2005 - 2006.
- President, Public Health Law Association, 2003 – 2004, Board of Directors, 2002 - 2005.
- Co-chair, Regional Smallpox Planning Team, Region 3, Michigan 2002 - 2004
- Vice President, 2004-2006, Board of Directors, Rotary Club of Flint, 2003.
- Chair, Workforce and Leadership Development Advisory Committee, National Association of County and City Health Officials, 2002 - 2005.
- Peer Reviewer, Guest Editorial Board, Health Education and Behavior, 2002.
- Member, Conference planning Committee, The Public's Health and the Law in the 21st Century, Atlanta, GA, June 2002.
- Member, Steering Committee, Michigan Public Health Training Center, 2001.
- Peer Reviewer, American Journal of Public Health, 2000.
- Member, Curriculum Committee, Michigan Public Health Training Center, 2000 - 2001
- Member, Leadership Development Collaborative, Turning Point, 2000 - 2002.
- Member, Program Planning Committee, Public Health Leadership Society Annual Meeting: Public Health and Primary Care, 2000.
- Participant, Public Health and Faith Communities Leadership Retreat, the Fetzer Institute, Kalamazoo, MI, May 2000.
- Member, Public Health Code Workgroup, Michigan Association for Local Public Health, 1999–present.
- Member, External Advisory Committee, Michigan Center for Environmental and Children's Health, University of Michigan, 1999 - 2000.
- Member, Advisory Board, Child Health Evaluation and Research Unit, the University of Michigan Health System, Department of Pediatrics, 2000.
- Consultant, Centers for Disease Control and Prevention, Public Health Law and Policy Workshop, Atlanta, GA, September 1999.
- Member, Selection Committee, 1998 Milton and Ruth Roemer Prize for Creative Local Public Health Work, American Public Health Association, July 1998.
- Member, Expert Panel, “The Future of Public Health”’ Institute for the Future, Menlo Park, CA, June 1998.
- Member, Faculty Search Committee, Program in Public Health Nutrition, University of Michigan School of Public Health, 1998.
- Board of Directors, Center for the Advancement of Community Based Public Health, 1997 – 2000.
- Member, National Advisory Committee, Turning Point: Collaborating for a New Century of Public Health, the Robert Wood Johnson Foundation and the W.K. Kellogg Foundation, 1996.
- Institute of Medicine\National Research Council, External Reviewer, Improving Health in the Community: Sharing Responsibility Through Performance Monitoring, August 1996.
- Institute of Medicine, External Reviewer for Committee on Using Performance Monitoring to Improve Community Health, June 1996.
- Member, Health Professions Partnership Forum, Health Resources and Services Administration, DHHS, Washington, D.C., May 1996.
- Board of Directors, Greater Flint Health Coalition 1996 - 2008
- Member, National Congress, Medicine/Public Health Initiative, Chicago, IL, March, 1996.
- Member, Institute of Medicine, Public Health Roundtable 1995 - 1996.
- Member, Dean Search Committee, University of Michigan School of Public Health, 1994 - 1995.
- President, Primary Care Policy Fellowship Society, 1994 - 1996.
- Board of Directors, National Association of County Health Officials (NACHO), 1992 - 1994.
- Chair, Primary Care Committee, NACHO, 1995.
- Member, Joint Council of Public Health Agencies Workgroup on Access, Assurance, and Reimbursement, 1995.
- Member, Planning Committee, NACHO Annual Conference, 1993 - 1994.
- Member, Agencies for Excellence Project, NACHO, 1994 - 1995.
- Chairman, Public Health Leadership Society Council, 1995 -1996.
- Board of Directors, Public Health Leadership Society, 1994 - 1997.
- Board of Directors, the Community Coalition, 1990 - 1996.
- Member, Health Advisory Screening Board, Community Foundation of Greater Flint, 1990 - 1994.
- President, Michigan Health Officer Association, 1989 - 1990.
- Board of Directors, Jewish Children and Family Services of Flint, 1990 - 1995.
- Member, Executive Council, Michigan Association for Local Public Health, 1988 - 1990.
- Alumni, Board of Directors, University of Michigan School of Public Health, 1986 - 1992, Chairman, 1989-92.
- Adjunct Faculty, University of Michigan, School of Public Health, 1995 -1997.
- Nonresident Lecturer, University of Michigan, School of Public Health, 1988- 1995.
- Board of Directors, Urban League of Flint, 1986-92.
- Chairperson, Nutrition Division, Michigan Public Health Association, 1983.
- Chairperson, Membership Committee, Michigan Public Health Association, 1982.
- Chairperson-elect, Nutrition Division, Michigan Public Health Association, 1982.
- Co-Chair, Community Nutrition Study Activity, Michigan Dietetic Association, 1982 - 1983.
- Secretary, Nutrition Division, Michigan Public Health Association, 1981.
- Grants Review Team, Michigan Nutrition Education and Training Program, 1980.
- Affirmative Action Committee, Food and Nutrition Section, American Public Health Association, 1980.
- Faculty Search Committee, Program in Human Nutrition, 1979.
- Executive Committee, School of Public Health, 1978 - 1979.
- Admissions Committee, Department of Health Planning and Administration, School of Public Health, 1977 - 1978.
