= CONOP 8888 =

Defense plan to counter zombies

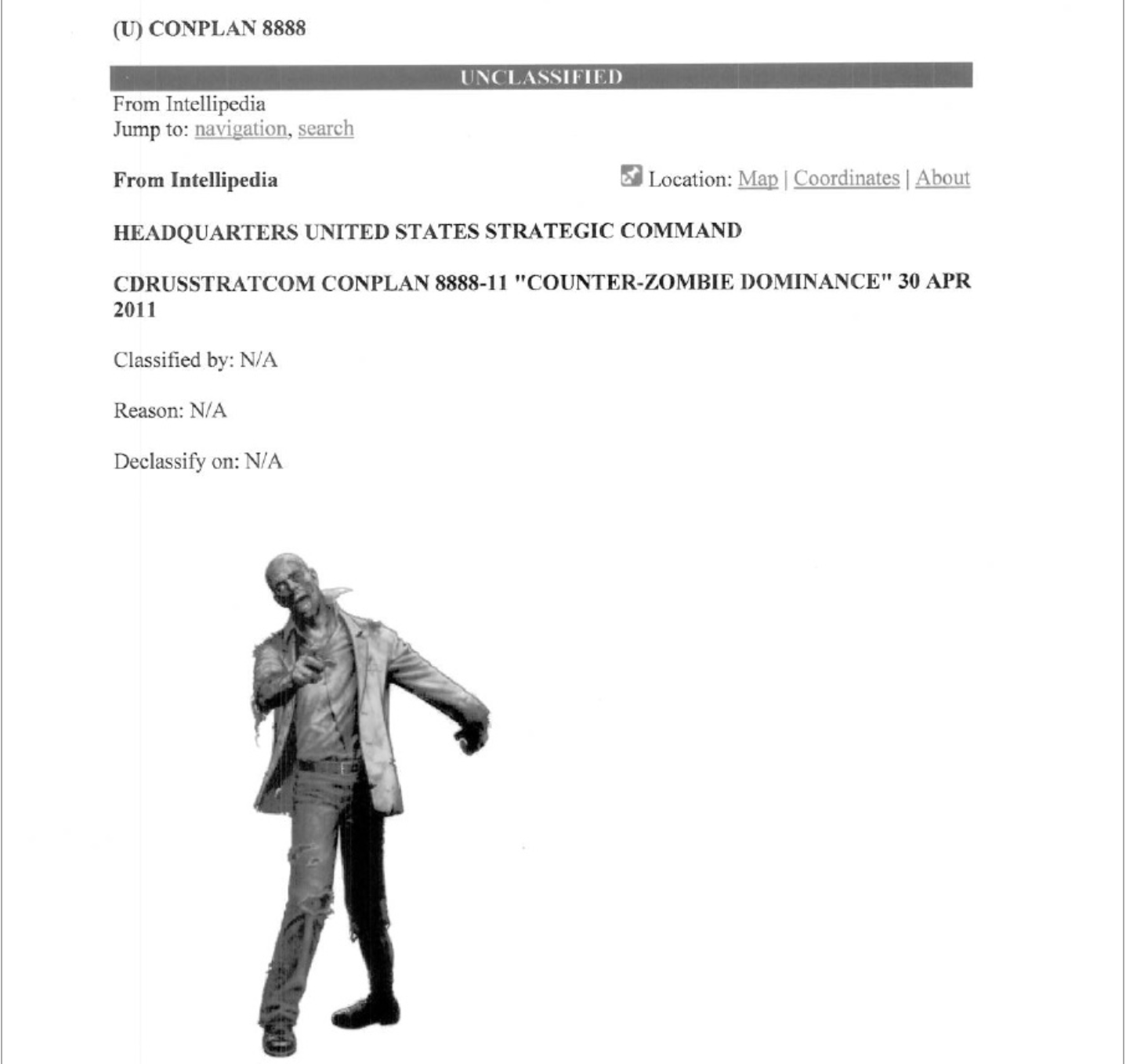
CONPLAN 8888 title page, featuring clip art of a zombie

CONPLAN 8888, also known as Counter-Zombie Dominance, is a U.S. Department of Defense (DoD) Strategic Command CONOP document that describes a plan for the United States and its military to defend against zombies in a fictional military training scenario. It was initially classified by the United States Intelligence Community, but was eventually declassified following a Freedom of Information Act request.

On April 30, 2011, the document was written as part of a fictional training scenario for junior officers undergoing training in JOPES, (Note: Joint Operational Planning and Execution System.) the DoD's contingency planning system and for strategic training. United States Strategic Command instructors found that a "zombie survival plan" made for "a very useful and effective training tool", while avoiding the political risks of using a real country in training scenarios.

== See also ==
- Zombie apocalypse
