= Zombie walk =

Public gathering

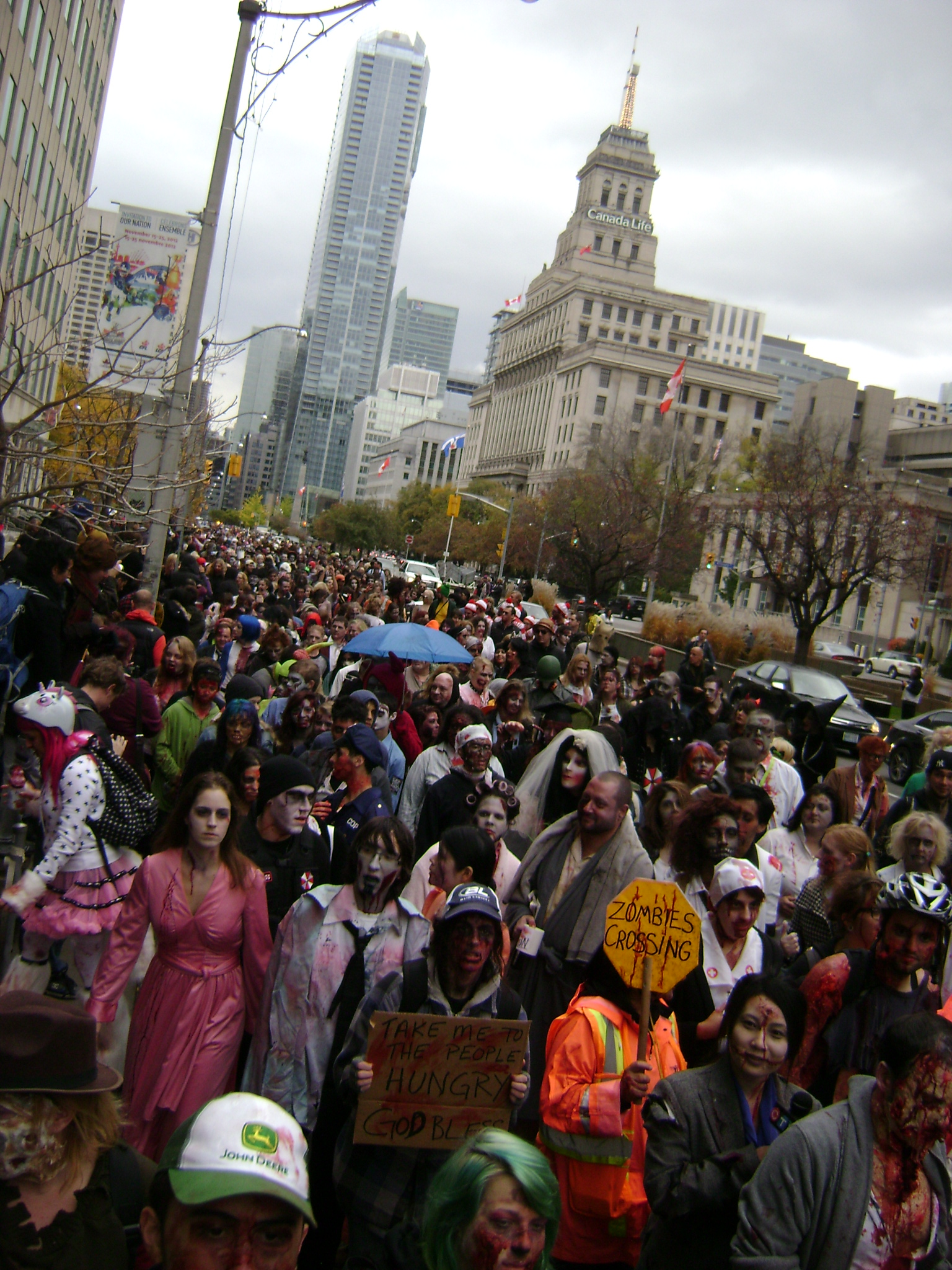
A 2012 zombie walk in Toronto

A zombie walk is an organized public gathering of people who dress up in zombie costumes. Participants usually meet in an urban center and make their way around the city streets and public spaces (or a series of taverns in the case of a zombie pub crawl) in an orderly fashion. Zombie walks can be organized simply for entertainment or with a purpose, such as setting a world record or promoting a charitable cause. Originating in North America during the 2000s, zombie walks have occurred throughout the world.

== Format ==
Zombie walks are relatively common in large cities, especially in North America. Some have been established as annual traditions, though others are organized as spontaneous flash mob events or performance art. The complexity and purpose of zombie walks varies. As an advanced technique to heighten interest and realism, some zombie mobs will "eat" victims to create new zombies, in sight of onlookers. Some participants occasionally dress up as soldiers who are called in to contain the outbreak, or survivors who are trying to defend themselves from the onslaught of the zombie horde. Some events are staged as spoof political rallies organized "to raise awareness of zombie rights", with participants carrying placards. Some zombie walks have also been staged as "hunger marches" with the intent of raising awareness of world hunger and collecting items for food banks.

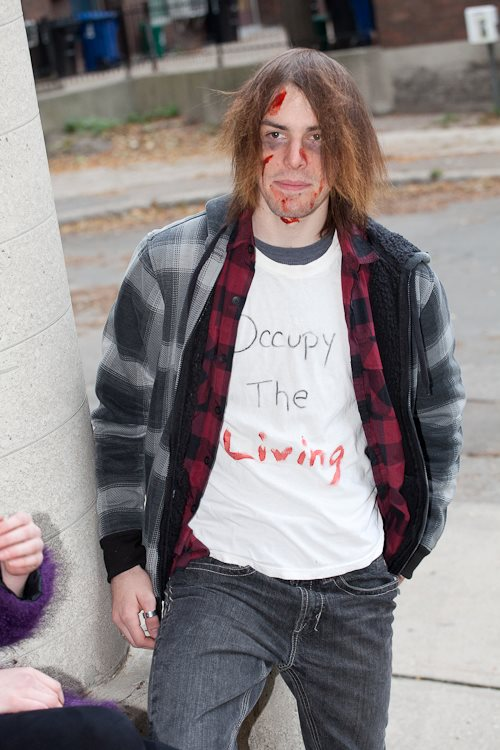
A zombie wearing a 'mock' political shirt during a Zombie Walk in Toronto, 2011

== History ==
=== Gencon 2000 ===
The earliest zombie walk styled event on record was put together rather last-minute at the Gen Con gaming convention in Milwaukee in August 2000. The event was created to poke good-natured fun at the Vampire: The Masquerade LARPers that were taking over large portions of the convention, and disrupt their games. Michael Yates, Mark Stafford, Jacob Skowronek and several others organized the event with roughly 60 participants. The event was later recorded in the book 40 Years of Gencon with photos and recollections from the organizers. While it was rumored that the organizers were arrested and thrown out of the convention for their flash mob of zombies, they were simply questioned by security before being told to disband.

=== Annual Trash Film Orgy film festival ===
Another early zombie walk was held in Sacramento, California on August 19, 2001.

The event, billed as "The Zombie Parade", was the idea of Bryna Lovig, who suggested it to the organizers of Trash Film Orgy as a way to promote their annual midnight film festival. It was held again on July 27, 2002, and has since become an annual event, drawing over 1,000 participants in 2012.

The event was traditionally held as the kick off to the six-week film festival at Sacramento's historic Crest Theatre until 2014 when the theatre's general manager of 28 years, Laura "Sid" Garcia-Heberger, could not reach a lease renewal agreement with the building owners.

Despite the film festival's change of venue, TFO continues the walk as part of a free all-ages event, the "Carnival of the Dead", which includes food trucks from local vendors, make up stations, live bands, contests, games, and a projected movie in the park at the end of the night. The streets in downtown Sacramento comprising the walk's route are shut down by the city in order to safely accommodate the large numbers of participants.

=== Toronto and Sherbrooke walk ===
The first gathering specifically billed as a "Zombie Walk" occurred in October 2003 in Toronto, organized by local horror movie fan Thea Munster and with only seven participants. A "zombie demonstration" occurred in Sherbrooke, Quebec, on November 1, 2003, organized by a local grassroots organization, with 60 participants walking on a one kilometer course downtown. Another zombie march was organized the next year by the same group in Sherbrooke, with nearly 200 participants. In subsequent years, the Toronto Zombie Walk has grown tremendously in size, with the 2014 event playing host to more than 15,000 participants. The Zombie Walk has spread to Vancouver, creating the zombie walk tradition in that city. On August 27, 2005, over 400 participants proceeded through Vancouver's Pacific Centre mall, travelled on the SkyTrain (referred to for the event as the "SkyBrain" or the "BrainTrain"), and continued 35 blocks to Mountain View Cemetery.

=== Gaining popularity ===
The mid to late 2000s saw an exponential gain in popularity for zombie walks, due largely to the success of zombie films at the time, such as the Resident Evil movies, 28 Days Later, Zack Snyder's Dawn of the Dead, Shaun of the Dead, George A. Romero's Land of the Dead, and Zombieland. Documentation of zombie walks consequently began to appear more often in mainstream news media and blogs. Zombie walks soon spread across North America and to cities around the globe, such as Mar del Plata, Argentina. Rio de Janeiro had its first zombie walk on November 2, 2007 (Day of the Dead) and the event has become annual since then.

On October 29, 2006, nearly 900 "zombie walkers" gathered at the Monroeville Mall outside of Pittsburgh, which served as the set of George A. Romero's classic zombie film Dawn of the Dead, to participate in Pittsburgh's first annual Walk of the Dead. In addition to setting a Guinness World Record, the event was a benefit for the Greater Pittsburgh Community Food Bank. Pittsburgh's zombie walk has since grown into an annual horror festival called Zombie Fest and organized by The It's Alive Show, a local Pittsburgh late night horror and science fiction television program. The Pittsburgh festival plays host to the annual Walk of the Dead as well as a zombie ball, costume contest, concerts, and celebrity guest appearances, and also serves as the headquarters of The It's Alive Show's World Zombie Day, a world hunger charity event.

Zombie walks are also a regular occurrence at ZomBcon, "the world's first zombie convention" which takes place every October in Seattle. Apart from zombie walks, ZomBcon also features panel discussions with zombie authors, actors and artists, workshops, film screenings, and other activities for zombie fans. ZomBcon also organizes Seattle's annual Red, White and Dead zombie walk every July.

=== World records ===
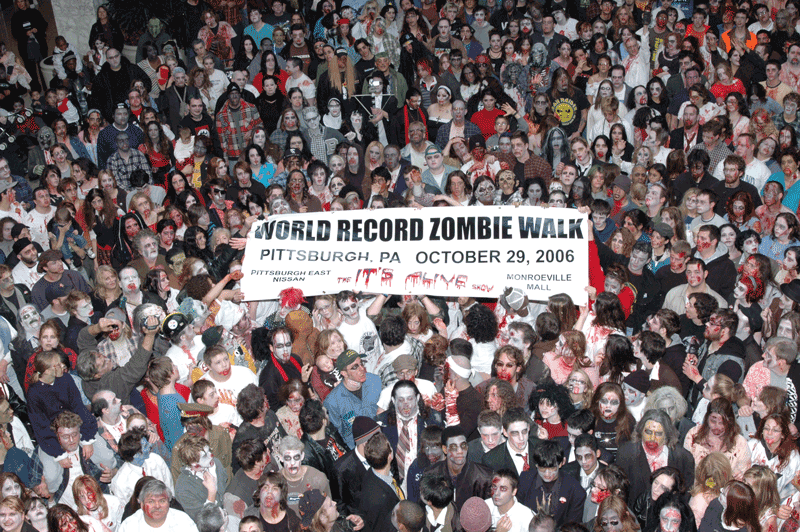
Official Monroeville Mall world record attempt photo in 2006

The first zombie walk world record was set on October 29, 2006 at Monroeville Mall outside of Pittsburgh, during the city's first annual Walk of the Dead. Guinness World Records certified that 894 people participated in the walk. The second zombie walk at Monroeville Mall during the 2007 Zombie Fest was also verified by Guinness World Records as the largest gathering of zombies to date, with 1,028 participants.

The 2007 Toronto Zombie Walk drew a crowd of over 1,100 zombies, a number confirmed by Toronto Police Services. At the time, this was the largest zombie walk on record. A zombie march in Brisbane on May 25, 2008 set an unofficial record of over 1,500 participants, according to media reports. On June 21, 2008, a zombie march took place in Chicago with over 1,550 zombies estimated, setting a new unofficial record.

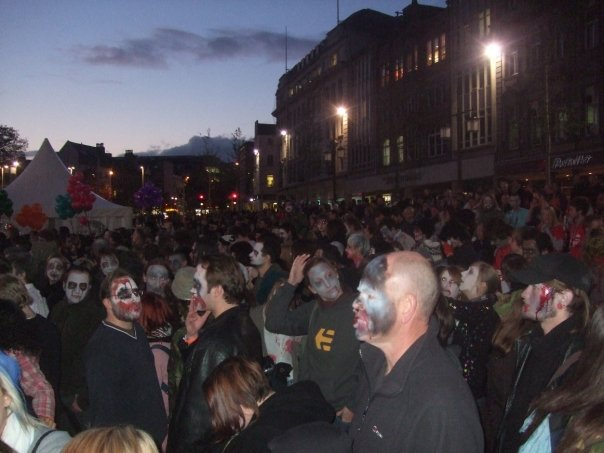
Nottingham Zombie Walk in 2008

On October 31, 2008, a zombie walk took place in the Old Market Square of Nottingham, England, with 1,227 attendees. The event was organized by GameCity, and the zombies did dances to zombie-related songs such as "Thriller", "Disturbia", and "Ghostbusters", and featured a performance from American singer Jonathan Coulton. The event achieved a new official Guinness World Record for largest zombie walk. In June 2009, Pittsburgh zombie fans won back the Guinness World Record after Guinness verified that the Zombie Fest 'Walk of the Dead' at Monroeville Mall on October 26, 2008, had 1,341 participating walkers.

On July 3, 2009, a zombie walk organized by Fremont Outdoor Movies in Seattle beat all previous zombie walk records. Guinness World Records officially recorded 3,894 zombies at the Red, White and Dead zombie event, though local news claimed 4277 participants. In October 2009, Guinness World Records officially recorded and approved a new record for the largest gathering of zombies. The record was set at the Big Chill Festival in Ledbury, England, on August 6, 2009. There were 4,026 zombie mob participants.

On October 25, 2009, the biggest recorded gathering of zombies in the Southern Hemisphere occurred in Brisbane, with over 5,000 participants reportedly in attendance as reported by the Queensland Police. The walk was also a charity event helping to raise awareness and money for the Brain Foundation of Australia. On October 30, 2009, zombie walkers in Grand Rapids, Michigan attempted a second run at the zombie mob world record. An estimated 8,000 participants braved rainy weather to gather in Calder Plaza outside of Grand Rapids City and County buildings. The event was coordinated by Rob Bliss, organizer of Grand Rapids's first zombie walk. Volunteers collected signatures from the crowd, though the record is currently unverified by Guinness. Organizers of the fifth annual Denver Zombie Crawl in Denver counted more than 7,300 zombie walkers in the event. This is considered to be a low figure, as up to one third of the total participants did not walk through the counter. The crawl took place on October 23, 2010, in downtown Denver at the 16th Street Mall. On October 24, 2010, a reported 10,000-strong zombie walk took place in Brisbane. As with previous years, the event raised money for the Brain Foundation of Australia.

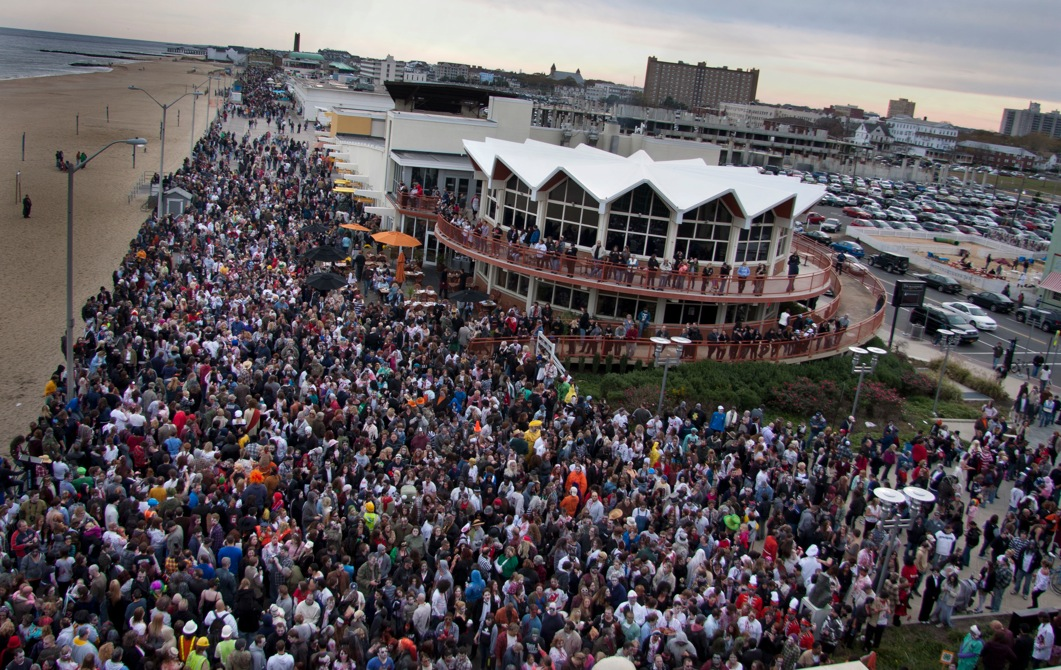
New Jersey Zombie Walk in 2010

Guinness officially recognized a new record for the world's largest gathering of zombies on October 30, 2010, at the third annual New Jersey Zombie Walk on the Asbury Park Boardwalk in Asbury Park. Guinness recorded 4,093 zombies at the event, though organizers, police, and fire officials estimate more than 5,000 zombies were in attendance.

In July 2011, more cities would attempt to break this world record. On July 2, 2011, Seattle attempted to take back the record at the 3rd annual Fremont Red, White and Dead Zombie Walk hosted by Fremont Outdoor Movies. The zombie count according to Fremont organizers was 4,522 in attendance with estimations of over 4,800–5,000 after the official stop point for counting zombies. Representatives from Guinness did not attend the event. On July 23, 2011, the Dublin Zombie Walk in Dublin had an estimated 8,000 zombies in attendance, but confirmation is still pending from Guinness World Records.

October 2011 also saw multiple attempts to break the New Jersey world record. Over 7,000 zombies are believed to have attended the 9th Annual Toronto Zombie Walk on October 22. Both the annual Denver Zombie Crawl on October 22 and the annual Brisbane Zombie Walk on October 23 claim to have had over 12,000 zombie participants. On October 29, the city of Long Beach, California, set out to break the world record as part of its fourth annual zombie walk, produced by community organizations Long Beach Cinematheque and Mondo Celluloid, and partnered with Michael Jackson-inspired flash mob "Thrill the World", who set out to break a world record of their own with the world's biggest "Thriller" flash mob. By night's end, an estimated 14,000 participants had taken over the entirety of the downtown area, breaking local business sales records and all but shutting down traffic for hours. In November 2011, Mexico City counted 9,806 for their large zombie gathering.

The zombie walk of October 20, 2012 in Santiago, Chile had more than 12,000 zombies walking in the city, though no Guinness record was broken. On October 28, 2012, Buenos Aires gathered 25,000 zombies.

The zombie walk occurring November 2012, in the Twin Cities (Minneapolis–Saint Paul) holds the current world record for zombie gathering, recognized by Guinness at a count of 8,027 at Midway Stadium in Saint Paul on October 13, 2012. Estimates of the entire Twin Cities crawl put the zombie event upwards of 30,000 zombie participates, surpassing any other gathering of its kind, official or not.

In 2013, the Asbury Park event reclaimed the world record with 9,592 zombies. In October 19, 2013 an estimated 15,000 Chileans took to the streets of Santiago to take part in the city's fourth annual Zombie Walk. The zombies limped two kilometres along the Alameda, one of the main thoroughfares in the Chilean capital.

== Charity events ==
Charity work continues to be a common component of zombie walks across the planet. Community service organizations such as Zombie Squad have used zombie walks as demonstrations to raise funds and awareness for local and global issues, such as world hunger.

Both world record walks at Pittsburgh's Zombie Fest have included food drives. In 2008, The It's Alive Show initiated World Zombie Day. The It's Alive Show encouraged cities all over the globe to celebrate World Zombie Day by holding zombie walks to raise awareness of global hunger. The first World Zombie Day took place October 26, 2008, the same day as Pittsburgh's Zombie Fest, when more than 30 cities worldwide took part. Food drives for local hunger-related charities took place at each participating city's zombie walk. Pittsburgh's walk alone brought in more than one ton of food to benefit the Greater Pittsburgh Community Food Bank. The second World Zombie Day took place October 11, 2009, with even more participation from cities all over the world.

October 21, 2012 saw over 12,000 participants march through the city of Brisbane. With a new music festival format added to the event, Brisbane Zombie Walk raised $55,000 for the Brain Foundation of Australia, making them the most successful zombie charity event in the world. In 2011, the Brisbane Zombie Walk made over $25,000 for the Brain Foundation.

== Pub crawl variant ==
Copenhagen Zombie Crawl 2011 – held on June 1

Some zombie walks incorporate pub crawling, during which participants visit multiple bars over the course of the walk. The first large-scale zombie pub crawl was held in Minneapolis on October 15, 2005. The crawl consisted of roughly 150 participants in zombie costumes moving from bar to bar in the city's Northeast district. The Minneapolis "Zombie Pub Crawl" has since become an annual event and attendance has grown exponentially. It has been held in Downtown Minneapolis since 2015.

Similar large-scale zombie-themed pub crawls have developed in New Orleans, Providence, Rhode Island, Reno, Houston, Eau Claire, Chicago, Winona, and Philadelphia. Zombie pub crawls are now a regular occurrence in cities all over the world. The New York City Zombie Crawl has involved attendees walk all over Manhattan and drink at different pubs. In 2007, the Viking Hats group organized a Halloween zombie walk in London that ended at the Tate London. London's Zombie Pub Crawl has become an annual Halloween weekend event. Winona Zombie Crawl started out in 2006 as a publicly unadvertised event where zombies showed up at bars, unexpectedly, to simulate an actual zombie apocalypse.

In 2007, zombies used bicycles to travel around town in the initial Ride of the Living Dead event in Kenosha, Wisconsin. An offshoot of the non-zombie summer Handlebars and Bars bicycle pub crawl, this event began with about 40 riders in its debut, and has since grown exponentially. In 2014, the event attracted over 400 zombie bicyclists and featured indie-rock bands from the Milwaukee-Chicago corridor as entertainment throughout the day.

== Incidents ==
In 2006, a young woman in Bloomington, Indiana reported to police that a group of "zombies" attacked her car by covering the vehicle in "purple goo"; the zombies in question turned out to be participants in a small, local zombie walk, and several arrests were made. At the 2006 Vancouver Zombie Walk, an incident occurred in which two impatient drivers attempted to drive their cars through a crowd of zombies headed down Robson Street: this resulted in some severe injuries among the zombies, but no damage to the vehicles. Another incident involved a pair of zombies using a brick to shatter the window of a man's car; both zombies were arrested.

In 2010, the annual Zombie Shuffle in Melbourne saw the largest attendance in its five-year history, but some locals complained of the mess that the zombie "gore" left behind, as well as the walk's disruption of a play for preschoolers. In 2011 and 2012, participants in the Minneapolis Zombie Pub Crawl broke store windows and caused other damage to the area in which the event was held. Many residents see the event as disruptive to the life of the neighborhood. In 2012, a Russian zombie walk in support of Pussy Riot in Omsk, Siberia was banned by the local government.

In October 2015, a shooting occurred at the ZombiCon in Fort Myers, Florida. 1 person was killed and 5 others were wounded. Lawsuits led to cancellation of the event the next year.

== List of past events ==
- Beach of the Dead (2007–2012) held annually in Brighton, East Sussex, England
- Asheville Zombie Walk (2006–2016), held annually in Asheville, North Carolina.

== See also ==
- Cacophony Society
- Cosplay
- Happening
- List of public house topics
