= Monster Nation =

2005 novel by David Wellington

- Author: David Wellington
- Language: English
- Series: David Wellington's Monster trilogy
- Genre: Horror
- Publisher: Thunder's Mouth Press
- Publication date: 2005
- Publication place: United States
- Media type: e-book & Paperback
- ISBN: 978-1-905005-48-2
- OCLC: 190966719
- Preceded by: Monster Island
- Followed by: Monster Planet

Monster Nation (2005) is a horror novel by American writer David Wellington. It concerns the opening days of a zombie apocalypse and the end of the world.

The novel was originally serialized online. It is a prequel to Monster Island (published online in 2004 and in print in 2006), and is one of a trilogy of novels, which also includes Monster Planet (2005).

== Plot ==
The Colorado Army National Guard is called in to investigate a strange epidemic at ADX Florence. Its soldiers struggle to contain the disease before it overruns the United States, and search for a mysterious woman who may be vital to the solution.

The novel begins with a mysterious woman in California being bitten on the street by a random man who walks up to her. She runs into the nearest establishment, an oxygen bar and proceeds to get high while waiting for the police to show up. The police arrive and take her to the hospital where a zombie outbreak is occurring. Although restrained, she manages to convince a nurse to let her go, who is then consumed by zombies.

While this is occurring, we are also introduced to two additional characters, Captain Bannerman Clark and Dick Walters. Captain Bannerman Clark is in the Colorado Army National Guard and is the Rapid Assessment and Initial Detection Officer in Charge, making him the always ready first man on the scene of any major disaster, trained to get the best intelligence on the situation and report to others who will take over. He is called away from enjoying a steak dinner alone to investigate an outbreak of what is believed to be a biological weapon at a prison in Colorado which spread from the prisoners to the guards, causing them to become perceived cannibals. The warden of the prison had travelled to California and had succumbed to the biological agent there, biting and infecting a young woman. Clark then goes to California to assess the damage.

Dick Walters is travelling in the rural areas of Colorado to check on an outbreak of an infectious agent in sheep. When he arrives at the farm, the woman he is there to visit greets him with a gun and surmises quickly he is not, "One of them." She takes him to an abandoned mine shaft where several zombies are trapped, zombies which ate her husband and young son. The pair spend the night on the roof of her cabin, waiting for the walkers to come.

Clark and the woman meet for the first time when she walks out of the hospital he arrives at, besieged by zombies. She is thought to be one of them and is to be executed in front of him when she disappears, removing her own aura. The girl then decides, after seeing a vision of a man, to head east towards Colorado. She is picked up by two delinquents along the way and runs amok with them for a bit, seeing a disturbing scene in a small town where the village kills a zombie. They eventually bunker down for the night in a small, abandoned inn. The woman, calling herself Nilla after Nilla Wafers, is approached for sex by the man of the group, but he runs when he sees she is covered in mold. She runs into the forest nearby and kills a bear when attacked, turning the bear into one of the undead. The next morning the trio depart.

Clark is determined to find Nilla after seeing her disappear, but his superiors force him to go to Washington to meet with and work for a civilian. The civilian likes Clark and intends on using him to figure all this out. Clark returns to Colorado to work on the cause of the disease and later transfers to Las Vegas for a short time as the West Coast is eventually overrun by zombies.

Dick and his companion eventually come off the roof and go exploring in the night. The woman is attacked atop a hill and he runs, tripping on a rock and falling down the hill. He has a concussion and is attacked, first by the woman's dead sheep, slaughtered to control the disease and then the woman herself. When he is reanimated without arms, he is drawn towards the source, an area nearby which exudes life force. He is eventually recruited by a voice coming from the source to go on a mission. The voice guides him along the way.

Nilla and her two friends leave the inn and go on, eventually stopping by a truck with two men in the back. The man goes and checks on the two and is bitten when it is revealed it is a zombie feasting on a corpse. The zombie is Dick and he is then tasked with following Nilla after she is abandoned by the woman and her dying boyfriend. Nilla continues on, psychically drawn to a house where she is met by a handicapped man who tells her she is the only one who can stop the source.
