= Zombie Squad =

Disaster preparedness organization

- Zombie Squad logo
- Abbreviation: ZS
- Formation: June 2003
- Type: 501(c)(3)
- Purpose: Disaster preparedness and community service
- Headquarters: St. Louis, Missouri, United States
- Main organ: Board of directors
- Website: http://www.zombiehunters.org

Zombie Squad is a 501(c)(3) non-profit community service and disaster preparedness organization that uses the metaphor of a "Zombie Apocalypse" for any natural or man-made disaster (hurricane, terrorism, earthquake, etc.). Zombie Squad was created by horror film fans who combined their shared interests of zombies and experience with disaster preparedness. It describes itself as an "elite zombie suppression task force ready to defend your neighborhood from the shambling hordes of the walking dead".

== History ==
Zombie Squad was created in St. Louis, Missouri in the summer of 2003. After watching the British horror movie 28 Days Later, a group of friends began discussing how they would prepare for a zombie epidemic, and how they would have handled the challenges faced by the characters in the film. This was the initial inspiration for Zombie Squad.

The stated goal of the organization is to present disaster preparedness in a manner which allows for serious exploration of multiple worst-case scenarios, while still maintaining a sense of humor and remaining grounded in non-disaster life. Zombie Squad combines a large online presence via its forums with community service and charity event participation to spread its message.

Zombie Squad has members all over North America and members in countries all over the world, including the United States, Canada, UK and South America among others. The success may be due in part to the synergy between two phenomena that have emerged in the new millennium: A resurgence of zombies in pop culture, with hit video games (the Resident Evil franchise, Dead Rising series, Left 4 Dead, Stubbs the Zombie, House of the Dead series, etc.), literature (Pride and Prejudice and Zombies: Dawn of the Dreadfuls, The Walking Dead franchise, World War Z, The Zombie Survival Guide) and films (28 Days Later, the Resident Evil series, the Dawn of the Dead remake, Shaun of the Dead, Land of the Dead, Zombieland, etc.) combined with a renewed interest in disaster preparedness in the wake of natural disasters (2004 Tsunami in Indonesia, Hurricane Katrina) and high-profile terrorist attacks (failed millennium plots, 9/11, 3/11, and the 2005 London bombings).

Zombie Squad's strict organizational refusal to adopt any one ideological stance has also helped create a community open to people from all backgrounds and walks of life. Despite Zombie Squad's tongue-in-cheek nature, the members of the organization bring a vast array of experience ranging from civilian American Red Cross disaster response volunteers and amateur radio emergency communications enthusiasts to professionally trained paramedics, firefighters and military personnel.

== Concept ==
The basic concept behind Zombie Squad is that zombies are a useful metaphor for a worst-case scenario: if someone is prepared to survive the complete breakdown of society due to an uprising of the living dead, then he or she will be prepared for almost any real-world disaster or emergency conceivable. The zombie metaphor was chosen for humor, originality, and as a bait and switch for horror movie fans, science fiction fans, gamers and others who otherwise may not be drawn to the idea of disaster preparedness or community involvement.

== Forums ==
The bulk of Zombie Squad's disaster preparedness and survival information can be found in its forums. Additionally, some of this information makes its way to the main page and the Zombie Squad RSS feed. The content of the forum is predominantly user-generated, and consists of a combination of information gathered from outside sources and personal experience. Collaboration between forum members transcends the forums proper, with members frequently joining together to perform "real life" activities related to preparedness (camping, mock "bug out" exercises, shooting range outings, etc.), take part in fundraisers, socialize, or team up in online multiplayer games such as Urban Dead and World of Warcraft. As of July 1, 2021 the forum has been deactivated; some of the Zombie Squad's members created a similar forum called Undead Forums of Zombie Squad to continue discussing disaster preparations without bringing in politics, religion, etc.

== Community service ==
One of the first major events that Zombie Squad participated in was the Archon convention in 2004. They hosted a seminar that dealt with basic disaster preparation under the guise of how to "survive a zombie apocalypse" which included the creation and use of a bug-out bag (or BOB), which they have continued to host annually at the convention.

Since its inception in 2003, Zombie Squad has organized charity events for organizations such as Meals on Wheels, American Red Cross, Youth In Need, Feed My People, Food Bank of Monmouth and Ocean County, Multiple Myeloma Research Foundation, Habitat for Humanity, Project S.H.A.R.E. and they have held a fund raiser for the victims of Hurricane Katrina and the May 2007 tornado outbreak.

They have participated in several flash mob-like events known as Zombie Walks to raise awareness for blood drives for the American Red Cross and local food banks. Their contributions charity organizations have also included zombie movie nights, trivia nights, Hot Wheels car races, food collection, and holiday parties.

== Zombie Con ==
Zombie Squad's principal event is a convention known as Zombie Con. The first annual Zombie Con took place in June 2005, and was staged in the style of a camping/hiking trip in Irondale, Missouri. Zombie Con consists of survival educational seminars, trips to a local shooting range, watching zombie movies and canoeing.

== See also ==
- Bug-out bag
- Disaster
- Emergency management
- Survivalism
- Zombie (disambiguation)
