= Monster Island (Wellington novel) =

2004 novel by David Wellington

- First print edition
- Author: David Wellington
- Language: English
- Series: David Wellington's Monster trilogy
- Genre: Horror
- Publisher: Thunder's Mouth Press
- Publication date: August 2004 (online) April 2006 (print)
- Publication place: United States
- Media type: E-book & Print (Paperback)
- Pages: 272
- ISBN: 1-56025-850-0
- OCLC: 64772295
- Dewey Decimal: 813/.6 22
- LC Class: PS3623.E468 M68 2006
- Followed by: Monster Nation

Monster Island is a novel in the zombie apocalypse horror subgenre by American writer David Wellington, published in serial online in August, 2004 and in print in April, 2006.

== Plot introduction ==
Monster Island takes place in Manhattan one month after New York City has been completely overrun by the undead.

A former UN employee named Dekalb, whose daughter is being held by a warlord in Somalia in exchange for his assistance, enters the zombie-infested island with a band of East African child soldiers in order to retrieve precious AIDS medication for the warlord. After surviving numerous zombie attacks, the group encounters Gary Fleck, an undead medical student who has managed to retain a high level of consciousness and self-control unlike other zombies.

== Critical commentary ==
Booklist called Monster Island "a fantastic zombie novel", and wrote: "There are many layers to this zombie apocalypse, and this book just gets things rolling."

In a review that was chiefly positive, Publishers Weekly praised the book's visceral impact, describing the plot as "inventive and exciting". They also commended Wellington for his knowledge of New York and the Monster Island's touches of dark humor, but felt that he displayed selective memory at times in composing the narrative.

The Washington Post gave the novel a strongly negative review, criticizing it for a lack of background information on the origin of the zombie menace, as well as what the reviewer considered to be nonsensical or absent motives for many characters' actions.
