= Ali S. Khan =

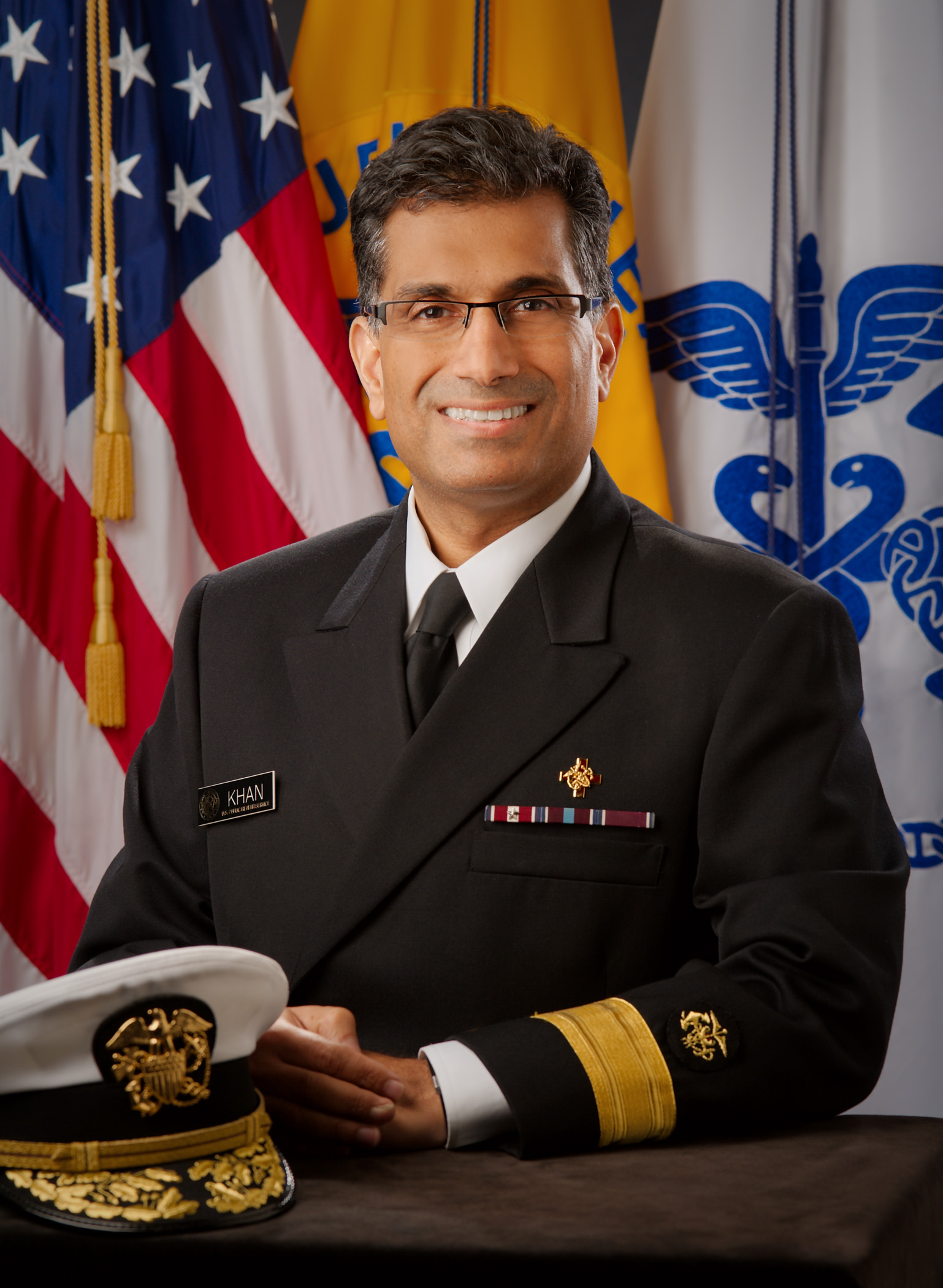

Ali S. Khan is an American practicing physician and former Director of the Office of Public Health Preparedness and Response (PHPR) at the Centers for Disease Control and Prevention. Since July 2014, he has served as Dean of the College of Public Health and Retired Assistant Surgeon General at the University of Nebraska Medical Center in Omaha, Nebraska.

== Education ==
Ali Khan received his Doctor of Medicine from the State University of New York Downstate Medical Center in Brooklyn, NY, and completed a joint residency in internal medicine and pediatrics at the University of Michigan. He later went on to pursue a Masters of Public Health (MPH) from Emory University.

== Career ==
Khan’s federal career began in 1991 when he joined CDC and the U.S. Public Health Service Commissioned Corps as an Epidemic Intelligence Service (EIS) officer. Dr. Khan has focused his career on bioterrorism, global health, and emerging infectious diseases. While serving as the interim Director for CDC’s global infectious disease activities, he designed CDC’s joint global field epidemiology and laboratory training program. Dr. Khan helped design and implement the President's Malaria Initiative, a $1.2 billion, five-year project to reduce the burden of malaria and relieve poverty in Africa. He has also been engaged in polio and guinea worm eradication. Additionally, Khan proposed the BioPHusion program as a new public health initiative to improve knowledge exchange for all public health practitioners. BioPHusion was used during the H1N1 pandemic to identify emerging cases and plan response actions.

Khan’s initial work in emergency preparedness started in 1999 when he helped establish CDC’s bioterrorism program, which upgraded local, state, and national public health systems to detect and rapidly respond to bioterrorism. As deputy director of the bioterrorism program, Khan created the Critical Agent list, which has remained the basis for all biological terrorism preparedness. Dr. Khan also published the first national public health preparedness plan, initiated syndrome based surveillance, and designed key focus areas to improve local and State capacities to respond to emergencies. Khan used these preparedness efforts during the first anthrax attack in 2001, during which he directed the CDC operational response in Washington, D.C.

Prior to becoming Director of PHPR in August 2010, Dr. Khan served as Deputy Director of CDC’s National Center for Emerging and Zoonotic Infectious Diseases (NCEZID). He has responded to and led numerous domestic and international public health emergencies, including hantavirus pulmonary syndrome, Ebola hemorrhagic fever, monkeypox, Rift Valley fever, avian influenza, severe acute respiratory syndrome (SARS), the Asian tsunami, and the initial public health response to Hurricane Katrina in New Orleans.

External videos
- Presentation by Khan on The Next Pandemic, May 25, 2016, C-SPAN

In 2016 Khan published The Next Pandemic: On the Front Lines Against Humankind’s Gravest Dangers (with William Patrick). In it he recounts some of his experiences responding to outbreaks all over the world, including many of those mentioned above. Besides his personal experiences, he also provides a great deal of background information for readers interested in public health and emerging diseases.
