= World War Z (disambiguation) =

World War Z is a 2006 apocalyptic horror novel by American author Max Brooks.

World War Z may also refer to:

- World War Z (film), a 2013 American apocalyptic action horror film
- World War Z (2013 video game), a 2013 mobile game developed by Phosphor Games
- World War Z (2019 video game), a PC and console game developed by Saber Interactive

== See also ==
- The War Z, a video game
