= Terry Gross =

American radio host and producer (born 1951)

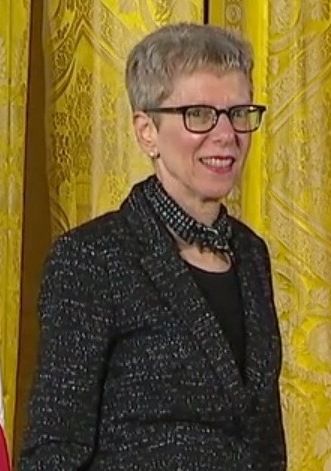
- Gross in 2016
- Born: February 14, 1951 (age 75); New York City, U.S.
- Education: University at Buffalo (BA, M.Ed)
- Occupations: Journalist, author
- Spouses: Unknown (m. 1970, divorced) Francis Davis (m. 1994; died 2025)
- Presenting career
- Show: Fresh Air
- Stations: WHYY-FM, NPR
- Country: United States

Terry Gross (born February 14, 1951) is an American journalist who is the host and co-executive producer of Fresh Air, an interview-based radio show produced by WHYY-FM in Philadelphia and distributed nationally by NPR. Since joining NPR in 1975, Gross has interviewed thousands of guests.

Gross has won praise over the years for her casual, friendly, yet often probing interview style and for the diversity of her guests. She has a reputation for researching her guests' work the night before an interview, often asking them unexpected questions about their early careers.

== Early life ==
Terry Gross was born in Brooklyn, New York City, and grew up in its Sheepshead Bay neighborhood, the second child of Anne (Abrams), a stenographer, and Irving Gross, who worked in a family millinery business, where he sold fabric to milliners. She grew up in a Jewish family, and all her grandparents were immigrants, her father's parents from Tarnów, Poland, and her mother's from the Russian Empire. She said that her family lived in an apartment near Senior's Restaurant, a local landmark. When she was young, people would often ask where Gross came from, assuming that her lack of a heavy Brooklyn accent meant she grew up elsewhere. She has an older brother, Leon J. Gross, who works as a psychometric consultant.

In 1968, Gross graduated from Sheepshead Bay High School. She earned a bachelor's degree in English and a Master of Education degree in communications from the University at Buffalo. While in college, she married her high-school boyfriend who attended the same university; they subsequently divorced. She took a year off from school to hitchhike across the country.

In 1972, Gross started teaching 8th grade at an inner-city public junior high school in Buffalo. She said she was ill-equipped for the job, especially at establishing discipline, and was fired after only six weeks.

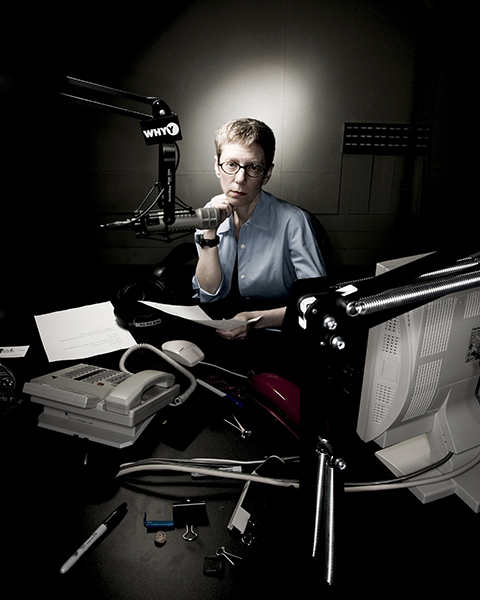
Terry Gross, host of the NPR radio program Fresh Air, in the WHYY studios in Philadelphia in 2004

== Career ==
Gross began her radio career in 1973 at WBFO, an NPR CPB-funded college station, then broadcasting from the Main Street Campus of the University at Buffalo in Buffalo, New York, where she started out as a volunteer on a show called Woman Power, then co-hosted This is Radio. Typical subjects of these shows were women's rights and public affairs.

In 1975, she moved to WHYY-FM in Philadelphia, Pennsylvania, to host and produce Fresh Air, which was a local interview program at the time. In 1985, Fresh Air with Terry Gross went national, being distributed weekly by NPR. It became a daily program two years later. Gross typically conducts the interviews from the WHYY-FM studios in Philadelphia, with her subject at the studio of a local NPR affiliate convenient to them, connected via telephone or satellite feed. For the majority of these conversations, Gross is not face-to-face with her subjects. Gross creates a daily show that is an hour long, usually includes two interviews, and is distributed to over 190 NPR stations. The show reaches an audience of millions of daily listeners. Many of the producers and staff on Gross's show have been with her since the late 1970s and 1980s.

=== Interview style ===
The San Francisco Chronicle wrote that Gross's interviews are "a remarkable blend of empathy, warmth, genuine curiosity, and sharp intelligence." Gross prides herself on preparation; prior to interviewing guests, she reads their books, watches their movies, or listens to their CDs. The Boston Phoenix opined that "Terry Gross ... is almost certainly the best cultural interviewer in America, and one of the best all-around interviewers, period. Her smart, thoughtful questioning pushes her guests in unlikely directions. Her interviews are revelatory in a way other people's seldom are."

Gross said that when she first started working in radio, her voice was much higher due to anxiety. For years she took singing lessons, and has worked to relax her voice and to achieve a more natural, deeper tone. Much has been written about Gross's voice, and the precision of her use of language has been the subject of much analysis.

=== Difficult interviews ===
There have been some occasions when Gross' interviews have not gone smoothly. Gross asked Nancy Reagan about the lack of funding and mishandling of HIV/AIDS by her husband, President Ronald Reagan, which was not well received. Several guests, including Lou Reed, Jann Wenner, Faye Dunaway, Peter Boyle, Monica Lewinsky, Bill O'Reilly, and Adam Driver, have stopped their interviews prematurely.

Three notable examples are:

- February 4, 2002: Kiss singer and bassist Gene Simmons. The interview began with Gross not pronouncing Simmons's original Hebrew last name to his liking. Simmons dismissively replied to her that she pronounced without "flavor" because she had a "Gentile mouth"; Gross responded that she is Jewish. In the interview, Gross asked Simmons about his studded codpiece, to which Simmons replied, "It holds in my manhood, otherwise it would be too much for you to take," adding, "If you want to welcome me with open arms, I'm afraid you're also going to have to welcome me with open legs," to which Gross replied, "That's a really obnoxious thing to say." Unlike most Fresh Air guests, Simmons refused to grant permission for the interview to be made available on the NPR website. The interview appears in Gross's book All I Did Was Ask. As of 2024, the interview is available in the Fresh Air archive online.
- October 8, 2003: Fox News television host Bill O'Reilly. O'Reilly walked out of the interview because of what he considered biased questions, creating a media controversy fed by the ongoing presidential campaign. Toward the end of the interview, O'Reilly asked Gross if she had been as tough on Al Franken, who had appeared on the program two weeks earlier. Gross responded, "No, I wasn't ... we had a different interview." Gross was later criticized by then NPR ombudsman Jeffrey Dvorkin for "an interview that was, in the end, unfair to O'Reilly" and that "it felt as though Terry Gross was indeed 'carrying Al Franken's water.' " Dvorkin described Gross's interviewing tactic of reading a quote critical of O'Reilly after he had walked out of the room as "unethical and unfair". Gross was later supported by an NPR colleague, Mike Pesca, who contended that O'Reilly did have the opportunity to respond to a criticism that Gross read to O'Reilly leveled by People magazine, but that he defaulted by prematurely abandoning the interview. On September 24, 2004, Gross and O'Reilly met again on O'Reilly's television show, where Gross assured O'Reilly, "no matter what you ask me, I'm staying for the entire interview."
- February 9, 2005: Lynne Cheney, conservative author and the wife of Vice President Dick Cheney. The initial focus of the interview was on Cheney's latest history book, but Gross moved on to questions about Cheney's lesbian daughter Mary and her opinion of the Bush administration's opposition to same-sex marriage. Cheney declined to comment on her daughter's sexuality, but repeatedly stated her opposition to a constitutional amendment banning same-sex marriage, which was being endorsed by President George W. Bush. Cheney declined to discuss the matter further. When Gross brought the interview back to issues of gay rights, Cheney again refused to comment. According to producers, Cheney had been warned that Gross would ask about politics and current events.

=== Other appearances ===
On October 30, 1988, Gross played radio host "Rose Butler" in a remake of the famous The War of the Worlds broadcast of fifty years earlier. The 1988 version was produced by WGBH in Boston and picked up by 150 National Public Radio stations.

Gross appeared as a guest voice on The Simpsons as herself in the episodes "The Debarted" and "The Girl on the Bus".

During the spring 1998 semester, Gross was a guest lecturer at University of California-Berkeley's Graduate School of Journalism.

In 2012, Gross appeared in a short comedic film by Mike Birbiglia titled "The Secret Criminal Life of Terry Gross."

In 2015 she appeared on Wait Wait... Don't Tell Me and played the game "Not My Job", answering questions about Hulk Hogan.

In June 2017, Gross appeared as a guest-voice on Clarence as Aberdale Public Radio host, Debra Copper, in the episode "Public Radio".

In January 2020, Gross appeared on the PBS program Finding Your Roots, in which she explored her Jewish heritage. A year prior, host Henry Louis Gates Jr. had been a guest on Fresh Air. At the conclusion of their Fresh Air interview, Gates invited Gross to appear on Finding Your Roots.

In 2020, Gross appeared as a fictionalized version of herself in the audiobook version of the Max Brooks novel Devolution.

She is the voice of Pam in the HBO Max animated series The Fungies!.

In 2026 she appeared as herself in a fictional interview on The Paper.

== Personal life ==
While she was in college in the late 1960s, Gross was married for about a year to a man she knew from high school, with whom she had been living previously. Gross said she dropped out of college in her sophomore year to hitchhike with him across the country before they were married. She obtained a divorce by the time she started her radio career in 1973.

Gross was married to Francis Davis, a former jazz critic for The Village Voice, from 1994 until his death in 2025. Together since 1978, Davis came from a Catholic background, but neither he nor Gross was religious. They resided in Philadelphia, Pennsylvania, and shared a passion for music. They had no children, which Gross has said was a deliberate choice on their part.

== Awards ==
External videos
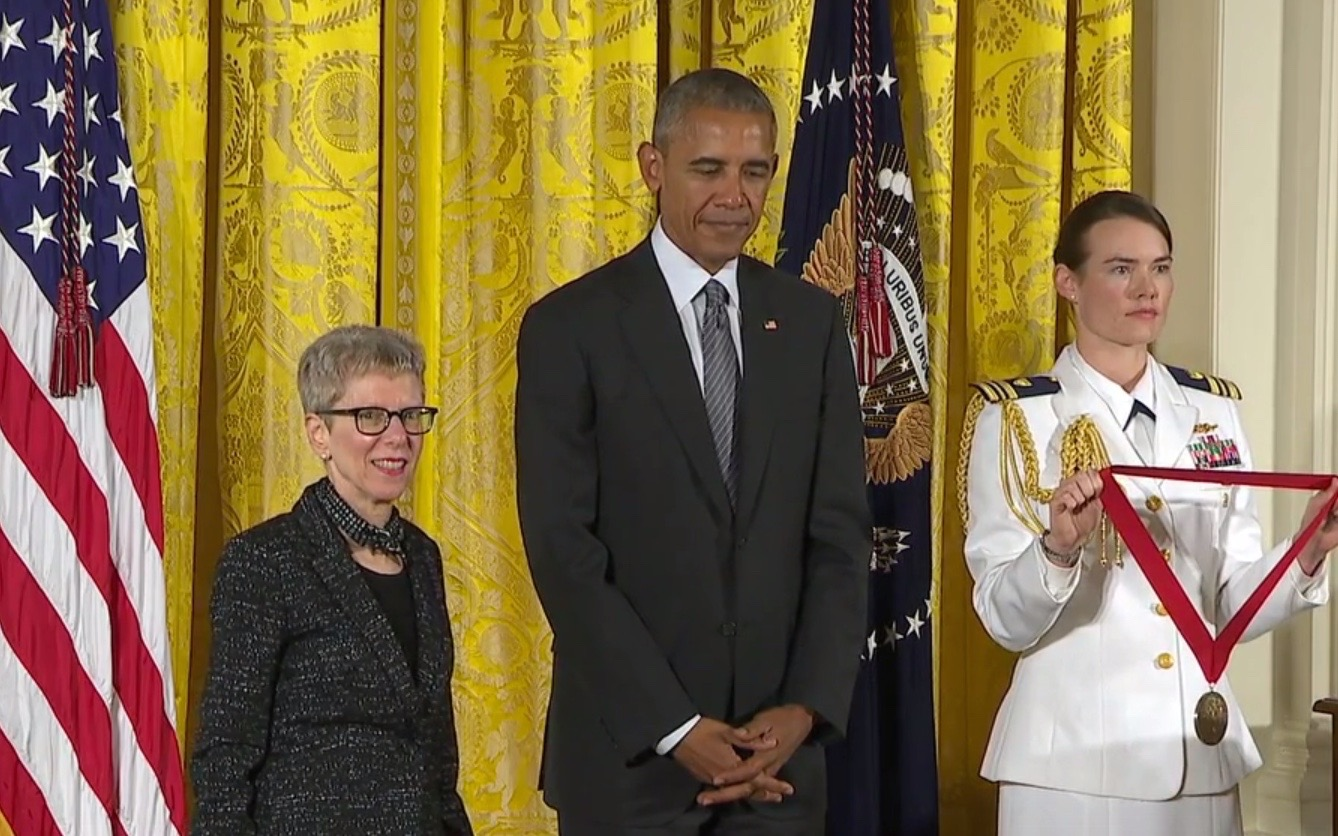
- Terry Gross Receives the 2015 National Humanities Medal, September 22, 2016, C-SPAN, user-created clip showing only the segment where Terry Gross receives the medal.

- 1981: Corporation for Public Broadcasting Award for Best Live Radio Program
- 1987: Ohio State Award
- 1989: Drexel University, Honorary Doctor of Letters
- 1993: SUNY–Buffalo, Distinguished Alumni Award
- 1994: Peabody Award
- 1998: Haverford College, Doctor of Letters
- 1999: The Foundation of American Women In Radio and Television's Gracie Allen Award, category: National Network Radio Personality
- 2002: Princeton University, Honorary Doctor of Humanities degree
- 2003: Corporation for Public Broadcasting's Edward R. Murrow Award
- 2007: Literarian Award, a lifetime achievement award given by the National Book Foundation
- 2007: SUNY–Buffalo, Doctor of Humane Letters
- 2008: Columbia University's Graduate School of Journalism, Columbia Journalism Award
- 2011: Authors Guild Award for Distinguished Service to the Literary Community
- 2012: Inducted into the Radio Hall of Fame
- 2015: National Humanities Medal
- 2022: Peabody Award

== Works and publications ==
=== Books ===
- Gross, Terry. All I Did Was Ask: Conversations with Writers, Actors, Musicians, and Artists. New York: Hyperion, 2004. ISBN 978-1-401-30010-4, ISBN 978-0-316-29123-1. OCLC 54459942, 56951611, 883328360.

=== Audio ===
- Gross, Terry. Fresh Air on Stage and Screen. [Washington, D.C.]: National Public Radio, 1998, 1996. Two sound cassettes. ISBN 978-0-966-46051-3. OCLC 41434003, 52244128.
  - Tape 1. Mel Brooks, Nicolas Cage, Michael Caine, Francis Ford Coppola, Robert Duvall, Laurence Fishburne, Ed Harris, Jeremy Irons, Nathan Lane, Mercedes McCambridge, Wallace Shawn/André Gregory
  - Tape 2. André Braugher, Divine, Faye Dunaway, Clint Eastwood, Dennis Franz, Audrey Hepburn, Dennis Hopper, Samuel L. Jackson, Harvey Keitel, Tracey Ullman
- Gross, Terry. Fresh Air on Stage and Screen. Vol. 2. [Washington, D.C.]: National Public Radio, 2000. Three CDs. ISBN 978-0-966-46053-7. OCLC 49194657, 780289464, 883328360.
  - David Chase, John Cusack, Catherine Deneuve, Peter Fonda, Gene Hackman, Uta Hagen, Werner Herzog, Dustin Hoffman, Anjelica Huston, Samuel L. Jackson, David Mamet, Bill Murray, Diane Keaton, Al Pacino, Sidney Poitier, Clarence Williams III, James Woods
- Gross, Terry. Laughs: Fresh Air with Terry Gross [Terry Gross Interviews 21 Stars of Comedy]. Philadelphia, PA: WHYY, 2003, 2004. Three CDs. ISBN 978-1-565-11919-2. OCLC 317883413, 56913808.
  - Disc 1: Ahmed Ahmed & Maz Jobrani, Al Franken, Bill Maher, Conan O'Brien, Richard Pryor, Martin Short, Tracey Ullman
  - Disc 2: Richard Belzer, Drew Carey, Larry David, Carol Leifer, Jon Lovitz, Colin Quinn, Chris Rock
  - Disc 3: Phyllis Diller, Jay Leno, Jackie Mason, Bob Newhart, Joan Rivers, Henny Youngman
- Gross, Terry, et al. Fresh Air with Terry Gross. Terry Gross Interviews 11 Stars of Stage & Screen. [Minneapolis, Minn.]: HighBridge, 2007, 2014. Two CDs. ISBN 978-1-598-87069-5. OCLC 893037211.
  - Dave Chappelle, George Clooney, Stephen Colbert, David Cronenberg, Tim Curry, Jodie Foster, Lisa Kudrow, CCH Pounder, Thelma Schoonmaker, Billy Bob Thornton, Robin Williams
- Gross, Terry. Fresh Air with Terry Gross. Faith, Reason & Doubt. [Minneapolis, Minn.]: Highbridge Co., 2008. Three CDs. ISBN 978-1-598-87533-1. OCLC 154744053, 893037213.
  - Disc 1. Karen Armstrong, Pastor John Hagee, Tim LaHaye, Julia Sweeney, Michael Wex
  - Disc 2. Richard Dawkins, Francis Collins, Barbara Brown Taylor, Steven Waldman, Shalom Auslander
  - Disc 3. Akbar Ahmed, James H. Cone, Khaled Abou El Fadl, Reynolds Price, Bishop Gene Robinson
- Gross, Terry. Fresh Air with Terry Gross Funny People: More Interviews with Stars of Comedy. Minneapolis, Minn: Highbridge, 2010. Two CDs. ISBN 978-1-598-87897-4. OCLC 464583118.

=== Video ===
- 2012: Birbiglia, Mike. Fresh Air 2: 2 Fresh 2 Furious (short film).
