= ZSG (disambiguation) =

ZSG, or Zürichsee-Schifffahrtsgesellschaft, is a public Swiss company operating boats on Lake Zürich.

ZSG may also refer to:

- Goodyear ZSG, a US Navy anti-submarine patrol blimp
- The Zombie Survival Guide, a tongue-in-cheek survival manual dealing with the potentiality of a zombie attack
