= Devolution (Brooks novel) =

2020 novel by Max Brooks

Devolution: A Firsthand Account of the Rainier Sasquatch Massacre
- First edition (US)
- Author: Max Brooks
- Cover artist: Will Staehle
- Genre: Speculative fiction, horror
- Published: June 16, 2020
- Publisher: Del Rey Books (US); Century (UK)
- Pages: 304
- ISBN: 978-1-9848-2678-7

Devolution: A Firsthand Account of the Rainier Sasquatch Massacre is a fiction book by American author Max Brooks set in the Pacific Northwest. It chronicles the story of a small, isolated community of technology-dependent city dwellers who suddenly are cut off from the rest of the world after a volcanic eruption. In addition to lacking outdoor survival skills and resources, they find themselves under siege by a clan of Bigfoot. The book was optioned by Legendary Entertainment to become a film, around the same time the book began to be sold to the public in June 2020. It was also nominated for Locus Award's Best Horror Novel in 2021.

== Plot ==
Thirteen months after the devastating eruption of Mount Rainier, a reporter receives an email from a man named Frank McCray who claims that a group of Bigfoot wiped out a nearby town named Greenloop. Frank's sister Kate Holland, one of the residents of Greenloop, has been missing since the eruption, leaving behind only a journal describing the events of the massacre. The narrative follows Kate's journal entries and interviews with Frank and National Park Service ranger Josephine Schell, interspersed with research on Bigfoot and news reports prior to and after the Mt. Rainier eruption.

The journal entries begin as Kate and her husband Dan arrive in Greenloop, a small ecocentric community that is the brainchild of technology mogul Tony Durant. Powered by solar panels and biofuel generators, Greenloop is designed to be the perfect community for the Green Revolution; it is removed from crowded cities yet still connected to modern conveniences. The community is ninety minutes from Seattle, with only one access road, completely out of cellular tower range. The residents depend completely on drone deliveries for food and supplies, and the only means of receiving wi-fi or a cellular signal is a single fiber-optic cable.

Kate's journal is initially a record kept to help manage her anxiety and OCD, addressed to her therapist. As Kate settles into the community, she describes her troubled relationship with Dan and the other residents of Greenloop; the retired Vincent and Bobbi Boothe, author and professor Alex Reinhardt, psychologists Carmen and Effie Perkins-Foster, their daughter Palomino, and artist Mostar. Tony Durant and his wife, former model Yvette, also live in the town. The community lives in an uneasy peace, which is seemingly made worse by the blunt attitude of Mostar.

Upon the eruption of Mount Rainier, Tony decides that the residents should shelter in place and wait for rescuers to arrive, relying on the capabilities of their homes to see them through the crisis. Mostar argues for the community to begin rationing supplies and other steps to increase their chances of survival, but the other residents dismiss her concerns. Mostar pressures Kate and Dan into helping her prepare, displaying an unusually high degree of survival skills. Kate and Dan's relationship slowly improves as Mostar encourages them to learn new skills.

Still unable to contact anyone outside the town, the residents grow increasingly worried as the crisis worsens. The population centers closest to Mount Rainier are hit hard by the eruption, and civil unrest begins to overwhelm Seattle. As the Washington National Guard and local officials try to regain control of the crisis, tensions in Greenloop grow worse as the town's food supplies dwindle. As the other residents begin to panic and turn on each other, Kate begins to find signs of an unknown animal in the area.

While out for a hike, Kate is chased into town by an unknown creature. Over the next few days, more signs of the mysterious creatures appear, culminating in Kate seeing an ape-like creature she described as the cryptid Bigfoot. Initially, the other residents refuse to believe her, claiming the creature is a bear. However, one night all the residents are awoken by several massive, ape-like creatures tearing open the town's compost bins and agree that they are dealing with a group of Bigfoots. Believing the creatures to merely be curious animals, Vincent attempts to communicate with them, but this only prompts them to attack the town by throwing rocks.

The following day, Vincent decides to try and hike out to obtain help despite Mostar's warnings. That night, the residents hear Vincent screaming in pain in the forest, which Mostar recognizes as a trap set by the Bigfoot clan to draw them out. Overcome by survivor's guilt, Kate and Dan go to investigate and discover the Bigfoot camp, where they find that Vincent has been eaten. They are ambushed by the Bigfoot clan, but Mostar saves them by threatening the creatures with fire. Mostar rallies the town to prepare defenses and weapons, but before they are finished, the Bigfoot clan attacks the town. Reinhardt, Tony, and Yvette are killed in the initial assault, and Kate is pursued by the leader of the clan, whom she calls Alpha. Alpha corners Kate in her house, but Kate manages to burn Alpha badly. Mostar kills one of the clan, but dies in the process. Kate learns that Mostar's survival skills are a result of her involvement in the Bosnian War. With Kate now leading, the remaining residents prepare for a last stand. The Bigfoot clan attacks, and though the residents kill most of the creatures, including Alpha, all the residents except Kate and Palomino are killed.

One week later, a team of rangers led by Schell arrive at the town. Kate and Palomino are gone, but the searchers discover the Bigfoot corpses. Thirteen months later, Frank is still searching the area around Greenloop, but Kate and Palomino's fate is unknown. Frank believes that the massacre triggered a primal desire in Kate to hunt the remaining Bigfoot.

== Reactions ==
[I]n light of current events, Devolution becomes a more disquieting read, and the horror is not necessarily found in the obvious places. Yes, the Bigfoot attacks are well orchestrated and surprisingly violent. The true terror for a post-pandemic reader, however, is in the grounded reality of how victims of disaster can be overlooked and how thin the veneer of civility and technology is revealed to be in the face of grand social disruption.

— Neil McRobert, The Guardian

Kirkus Reviews was positive, calling the book "a tasty, if not always tasteful, tale of supernatural mayhem". Publishers Weekly and Library Journal also had positive reviews, saying that Brooks "packs his plot with action, information, and atmosphere, and captures both the foibles and the heroism of his characters", and that it was a "creative and well-executed conceit" that would also appeal to "those who appreciate nonfiction survival stories". The Washington Post was negative, with the review titled "A great Bigfoot novel may be lurking out there. Max Brooks's Devolution isn't it". USA Today gave it a mixed review, saying that it was an "ambitious mishmash of individually interesting pieces. Not quite sharp enough for compelling satire, a little too sneering for effective horror, it will find plenty of readers among devotees of Brooks, but will be a miss for most general readers". American gun enthusiast and self-defense instructor Massad Ayoob reviewed the book, concluding that it presented a good case for firearms ownership.

== Audiobook ==
An audiobook version of Devolution was produced by Penguin Random House Audio. Like the audiobook version of his previous novel, World War Z, Brooks voices the main interviewer, while other characters are voiced by a full cast.

=== Cast ===
- Max Brooks as the researcher
- Judy Greer as Kate Holland
- Nathan Fillion as Frank McCray
- Kimberly Guerrero as Josephine Schell
- Jeff Daniels as Steve Morgan
- Mira Furlan as Mostar
- Kate Mulgrew as Hannah Reinhardt-Roth
- Steven Weber as Tony Durant
- Terry Gross as herself
- Kai Ryssdal as himself
