= The Harlem Hellfighters =

2014 graphic novel

- Front cover of The Harlem Hell fighters
- Creator: Max Brooks (writing); Caanan White (art)
- Date: April 1, 2014
- Page count: 272 pages
- Publisher: Broadway Books
- ISBN: 9780307464972

The Harlem Hellfighters is a graphic novel written by author Max Brooks with illustrations done by Caanan White. It is a fictionalized account of the experiences of the largely African American 369th Infantry Regiment, nicknamed the "Hell-fighters" by German soldiers, during the First World War.

== Plot ==
The novel is narrated by Mark, a veteran of the 369th's tour in Europe. It begins upon the inception of U.S. involvement in World War I, with recruitment for the 15th New York National Guard Regiment being held in Harlem, New York. The soldiers, though all black, come from a diverse array of backgrounds, classes, and cultures, leading to some initial internal strain. The 15th is headed by Lieutenant Adams and Sergeant Mandla.

In July 1917, the regiment commences basic training at Camp Whitman, where they are strictly disciplined and educated by a benevolent Adams. Concurrently, members of the regimental band are subjected to the precise training of renowned bandleader Lt. James Europe. It's here that the African-American soldiers begin to first feel the effects of segregation with the United States Army; they are given uniforms later than their white counterparts and train with broomsticks in the place of rifles.

In October, the regiment is reassigned to Spartanburg, South Carolina to finish their training. Fears run high within their ranks given that the town is located in the Jim Crow South; only weeks earlier tensions between racist locals and African-American trainees had led to a riot in Houston. In order to preserve the well-being of his men, Lt. Adams orders them to completely ignore any verbal or physical provocations made by the local populace. Mark and several of his fellow infantrymen are subject to a vicious beating at the hands of townsmen that is only broken up when white soldiers from the 7th Infantry Regiment intervene.

After a handful of weeks in Spartanburg, the 15th is deployed to France. When they reach the Western Front in January 1918, the regiment is bitterly assigned to laborious roles, unloading ships and performing janitorial tasks for the American Expeditionary Force.

After months more of "pick and shovel work," the 15th is reorganized into the 369th Infantry Regiment and transferred under the jurisdiction of the French Fourth Army. The French soldiers show a foreign level of acceptance and tolerance of the black presence. Mark's friend David Scott is killed by a sniper on their first day in the trenches whilst naively peeking into no man's land.

The 369th is soon taken aback by the brutal realities of war; the rat-infested, muddy, lice-encompassed trenches become a subject of much complaining. Nonetheless, the soldiers soon prove themselves in combat. Private Henry Johnson becomes the first American to receive the Croix de Guerre after dispatching a German "raider party" armed solely with a bolo knife and rifle, saving the lives of multiple comrades. This results in the 369th's rise to prominence on both sides of the war, with the Germans nicknaming them the Harlem Hellfighters. As the war progresses, bombings and gas attacks become part of the 369th's daily routine.

The African American soldiers soon face intense discrimination from their white counterparts; they are eventually barred altogether from social interactions with the friendlier French. Mark is soon arrested by military police after defending himself against a provocation by white soldiers. A frustrated Mark, insisting that he is fighting a "white man's war", transfers to a labor unit.

Anticipating the Second Battle of the Marne, the Expeditionary Force formulates a plan to retreat from the would-be German assaulted forward trenches whilst bombarding German supply roads. However, in order for this to be executed, the Americans must enforce the illusion that the trenches are still stocked with men by placing a "volunteer unit" left behind. Lt. Adams subsequently volunteers the 369th for this duty. Shortly before combat commences, Mark returns to his regiment, who rides out German bombardment of the forward trenches completely unscathed.

Immediately afterwards the 369th participates in the perilous Allied counterattack, with Sgt. Mandla being killed in the process.

The novel ends with a series of conclusory panels, dictating that the Harlem Hellfighters spent 191 days in combat, were the first Allied unit to reach the Rhine, and that they received a victory parade upon their return home to New York.

== Production ==
Brooks' interest in the 369th Infantry Regiment was sparked as a 10-year-old, when a tutor told him their story. As an adult, Brooks attempted to have their story turned into a film, pitching his script across the movie industry to no avail. The various studios Brooks sought out believed that World War I had been rendered obscure to the general American public; they believed a film dealing with the subject would not be profitable. Finally, after collaborating with White on a graphic companion to his novel The Zombie Survival Guide in 2006, Brooks realized the story could be told within the comics medium sans the financial concerns of film.

=== Fact vs. fiction ===
Brooks often employed the use of amalgamation in creating the characters of The Harlem Hellfighters, taking inspiration from real life soldiers and transmitting it onto the pages in the form of a single individual. For example, Lt. Adams was a combination of several black officers at the time. The role of a French officer derived inspiration from an excerpt of From Harlem to the Rhine. Concurrently, real-life members of the 369th were utilized in the novel's fictionalized retelling, among them James Europe, Henry Johnson, Arthur Little, and Henri Gouraud.

Another difference between the book and reality is that while the Hellfighters did receive a parade in Paris and were adored and considered heroes by the French, they were not given many accolades when they returned home to the United States, aside from a parade in New York City on February 17, 1919. In fact, a number of the 369th soldiers elected to stay in France after the war was over, rather than come back to a segregated America, where they would be expected to resume their place at the bottom of the social ladder.

== Reception ==
=== Critical ===
Reaction to the graphic novel was positive. Harvard professor Henry Louis Gates Jr. hailed The Harlem Hellfighters as "a major contribution to our understanding of Black History." The Washington Post went on to praise the illustrations, arguing that "White’s grid work is forever shifting, as his overlapping panels shuffle like snapshots fallen from a scrapbook, and his full “splash” pages are so visually engaging that the greedy reader wishes he'd provided yet more of them.

== Film adaptation ==
Sony Pictures has purchased the rights to create a film version of the novel, with Caleeb Pinkett and James Lassiter producing on behalf of Overbrook Entertainment under the leadership of Will Smith.
