= Solanum (disambiguation) =

Solanum may refer to

== Biology ==
- Solanum, a genus of flowering plants.
- Solanum virus 1, commonly called potato virus X
- Solanum virus 2, commonly called potato virus Y

== Other uses ==
- Solanum, a fictional virus referred to in The Zombie Survival Guide by Max Brooks
- Solanum, a deceased alien from Outer Wilds
