= World War Z (2013 video game) =

- Developer: Phosphor Games
- Publisher: Paramount Digital Entertainment
- Engine: Unreal Engine 3
- Platforms: Android, IOS
- Release: May 30, 2013
- Genre: First-person shooter

World War Z is a first-person shooter mobile game developed by Phosphor Games and published by Paramount Digital Entertainment (being the last game they would make before being defunct) on iOS and Android devices. It was released on May 30, 2013, coinciding with the release of the feature movie of the same name. Both the game and the film are loosely based on the 2006 novel World War Z, with the game set in the same universe as the film adaptation.

== Gameplay ==
World War Z is a first-person shooter spanning 28 missions. The Player assumes the role of a zombie apocalypse survivor attempting to locate and rescue his son. The player is mainly tasked with engaging zombies in combat and solving environmental puzzles to progress through each mission, with the opportunity to upgrade their weapons and armor between missions. Though the events of the game run concurrently with the events of the film, the stories of either do not overlap.

== Reception ==
Reception

Aggregate score
| Aggregator | Score |
|---|---|
| Metacritic | 65/100 |

Droid Life called the game "visually impressive." Game Revolution called it an "engaging movie tie-in." Kotaku referred to the game as better than expected. GameTrailers said the game's controls may "change the first-person genre on mobile." Modojo said the game's control scheme "removes the hassle" of playing first person shooter games on touchscreens.
