= Infestation: Survivor Stories =

2012 video game

- Developer: Hammerpoint Interactive
- Publisher: OP Productions
- Producer: Sergey Titov
- Writer: Sergey Titov
- Engine: Eclipse
- Platform: Microsoft Windows
- Release: WW: December 17, 2012
- Genre: Survival horror
- Mode: Multiplayer

Infestation: Survivor Stories (formerly known as The War Z) was an open world zombie video game developed by Hammerpoint Interactive and published by OP Productions. Infestation: Survivor Stories features both first-person and third-person shooting perspectives. The game offers players the option of killing zombies or playing against other users (PvP).

Infestation: Survivor Stories was able to be purchased and played online without the need for an ongoing monthly subscription with free updates. Players could, however, purchase cosmetic and convenience items such as ammo, and other items that they would otherwise have to find in the game. Infestation: Survivor Stories had dedicated public servers accessible by all players in addition to player-purchased private servers. A "spiritual successor" to the game, Romero's Aftermath, was released by Free Reign Entertainment on September 25, 2015.

The game was panned by critics, with many considering it one of the worst video games of all time. The game servers were taken offline on December 15, 2016.

== Gameplay ==
Infestation: Survivor Stories was a zombie survival game where players endure the hardships of a post-apocalyptic, zombie-infested world. By collaborating with other players, and finding weapons and items, players increase their chances of survival. The game incorporated survival elements like hunger and thirst, which gradually decrease over time. Supplies such as food and water could be found to battle hunger and thirst. If the player failed to properly quench their hunger and thirst, the player's character would eventually die. It was possible to buy food and drinks if the player had none or chose not to scavenge for the items in the world. Items carried by the deceased character were lost on death - whether purchased in-game or not - but could be found and retrieved by other players, continuing the cycle of life and death in the game.

Safe settlements or safe zones gave users an area where they were protected from combat and zombie attacks. There, players could access "Global Inventory" - an inventory shared between characters - and shop for items via the General Store.

Outside the safe zones, players could engage in player versus player combat and player versus environment combat with zombies. Killing other players granted the user reputation based on the victims standing and a chance to collect their dropped items, whereas killing zombies granted the user experience points for use in the game's skill tree.

== Development ==
Infestation: Survivor Stories was developed originally under the name The War Z by OP Productions. The War Z began its open alpha on October 15, 2012 and was fully released on Steam December 17, 2012. Two days after the launch, the game was removed from Steam due to false advertising; several features listed in the store description were not available in the game. After rectifying the issue, The War Z was again made available for purchase on Steam on February 26, 2013. On April 4, 2013, the source code of The War Z became available, most probably as leaked code from a hacked server. On June 20, 2013, the game's name was changed to Infestation: Survivor Stories due to trademark problems.

The game was rebooted by Swedish developers Fredaikis AB as Infestation: The New Z in late 2016.

== Reception ==
=== Alpha reception ===
A reviewer for PC World stated that "overall, the game looks terrific" and had the "typical alpha bugs" of an alpha release, with the game holding promise. A reviewer for Joystiq praised the character personalization, saying there were more options than they expected and the gameplay would be easy for experienced gamers to understand. Another reviewer for Joystiq commented that one of the game's biggest dangers comes from other players, with the game currently not having any rules or policing regarding the PvP element and hacking.

=== Critical reception ===
Reception

Aggregate scores
Aggregator	Score
GameRankings	19%
Metacritic	20/100

Review scores
Publication	Score
Eurogamer	3/10
GameSpot	2.0/10
GameSpy	0.5/5
IGN	3.0/10
PC Gamer (US)	30/100
Metro	1/10

On release, the game was universally panned by critics. Aggregate review website Metacritic assigned an overall score of 20 out of 100 based on reviews from 13 professional critics. GameSpy writer Craig Pearson stated that the game "displays astonishing design ineptitude and some of the worst kinds of microtransactions in gaming, all in one ugly package". Eurogamer's Rich Stanton gave it 3 out of 10, calling it "a real disaster" and criticized both the game's design and the developer's ethics. Stanton elaborated that the developers were "both dishonest and incompetent."

Despite the negativity, Infestation: Survivor Stories has sold 2.8 million copies since the game launched in November 2012.

=== Controversies ===
On November 15, 2012, the United States Patent and Trademark Office (USPTO) sent a letter to the game's publisher and developer stating that the request to trademark the name The War Z had been suspended. The cause of the suspension was the close resemblance of the game's name to the title of Paramount Pictures' then-upcoming film World War Z. On December 24, 2012, Titov responded by saying that he does not think that the trademark has been suspended even though the USPTO lists it as suspended.

On December 17, 2012, Hammerpoint Interactive launched the "foundation release" of the game on Valve's digital distribution platform Steam. Sergey Titov stated in a press release "Now that we've reached the Foundation Release milestone we will continue to work, as promised, to add features and content that will satisfy our community and keep them playing." The developer was accused of attempting to get customers to buy the game directly from their website rather than Steam's platform by claiming that they would be raising the price of the game on Steam.

Following the game's release, many customers accused the developers of fraud because of key features that were advertised but not featured in the game. The game was initially described on Steam by the developers as containing certain features, such as multiple large game worlds varying in size, a skill point-based leveling system, player versus environment combat, hundred-player servers, and private servers, none of which were a part of the game at the time. The Steam page was updated within 24 hours of release, but still mentioned features not yet in the game. Titov defended the way the information was presented by stating that the map size and player limits fell within the ranges shown, e.g., "Size of the area, once again, come on—[the] first map is over 100 sq km. So [the] text is right." However, an independent analysis by PCGamesN.com estimated the actual map size at just under 10 sq km. Titov also claimed that players had misread the information about the game's features on the store's page. The game was pulled from Steam and any customer who purchased the game during the initial sale of the game was eligible to receive a full refund from Steam, which was at the time an almost unheard-of move by Valve.

The game has also received criticism for using a pay-to-play business model while including the micropayments frequently seen in a freemium game. On the day of the game's launch, players could respawn one hour after their character died. On the following day, Hammerpoint Interactive released an update that increased the respawn time to four hours and added the ability to instantly respawn for in-game currency that is purchased through microtransactions. Two days later, a patch was released that returned the respawn time to one hour.

When questioned about the complaints received, Titov responded by saying that the customers complaining were a minority and "As of right now over 93% of our customers like the game, with over 40% saying it's perfect and around 50% saying it's good, but they'd like to see more polishing and features."

On December 19, 2012, a Valve employee stated that they would be investigating concerns raised by users about censorship and moderation on Steam's forum. The concerns were directed towards a developer of the game who was accused of banning Steam forum users unfairly for criticizing The War Z. On the same day, The War Z was temporarily removed from sale on Steam's store, with Valve issuing a statement saying "We apologize for this and have temporary [sic] removed the sale offering of the title until we have time to work with the developer and have confidence in a new build." A user also proved that ban appeals were not looked over; instead, copy and paste responses were issued stating "We have evidence that you have used multiple hacks. Your ban appeal has been denied." The developers have also been accused of bullying and bribing people who complain about the game. Valve allowed users to submit a ticket for a refund if they weren't satisfied with the game.

On April 2, 2013, OP Productions announced that The War Z game and forums had been taken offline as "hackers gained access to our forum and game databases and the player data in those databases." Hackers gained access to user information such as email addresses, character names, IP addresses, and encrypted forums passwords. No payment information was stolen, though it was noted that simple passwords would not be difficult to extract from the stolen data. OP Productions later confirmed that hackers gained access to several administrator accounts resulting in deletion of the forums database as well as the banning of "several dozens" of players.
