= Minecraft: The Island =

2017 novel by Max Brooks

- Author: Max Brooks
- Language: English
- Genre: Fiction
- Publisher: Del Rey Books
- Publication date: July 2017
- Pages: 288
- ISBN: 9780399181771

Minecraft: The Island is a young adult novel by Max Brooks, published in July 2017 by Del Rey Books. It was followed by two direct sequels: Minecraft: The Mountain (published in March 2021) and Minecraft: The Village (published in October 2023).

== Background ==
Brooks' interest in the sandbox video game Minecraft began around 2012 when a friend introduced him to the game. In 2015, he was contacted by Mojang to write a novel centered around the game. Brooks, wanting to "justify all those hours I've spent playing Minecraft", agreed to the task, and by the time that Mojang asked him to sign a contract regarding this endeavor, he had finished a manuscript. Mojang publicly revealed that a novel was in progress during Minecon 2016.

When he was writing the novel, Brooks was allowed control of everything save for what the main character looked like, which Mojang, characterizing them as a "cuboid Robinson Crusoe", wanted to make vague as to widen the demographic of readers that could personally connect to them. To this end, Brooks took care to not use gender pronouns when describing the protagonist, who is never given a name.

== Plot ==
The book is divided into chapters that each teach a specific life lesson. The plot is framed around a protagonist from the real world falling asleep and unexpectedly waking up in the world of Minecraft. They have no memory of who they were before, only general knowledge of the world. The main protagonist wakes up underwater, and thinks he must have fallen off a boat. They pick a direction and starts swimming, soon coming across a small island. They face denial that this world is real, and deals with extreme confusion and panic at this stage. They then slowly determines the rules of the world they live in and begins to accept them as reality. Meeting and befriending the local wildlife (a pet cow).

== Publication history ==
Minecraft: The Island was published in July 2017 by Del Rey Books. Since Mojang did not want to solely have an audiobook with the voice of one gender, two were released: one read by Jack Black and the other by Samira Wiley.

== Reception ==
Jason Sheehan of NPR was intrigued by Brooks' ability to create a story that adhered to the restrictions imposed by Minecraft's game mechanics, calling the novel "a master's thesis on internal consistency in genre literature". Tim Martin of 1843, however, thought that the novel focused too much on those mechanics at the expense of plot and character development. Likewise, Kirkus Reviews thought that this focus made the novel a worse version of Robison Crusoe. Though describing the plot as "ha[ving] a mechanical feel", John Peters of Booklist wrote that the book contained "useful hints and strategies".
