= Max Brooks =

American writer (born 1972)

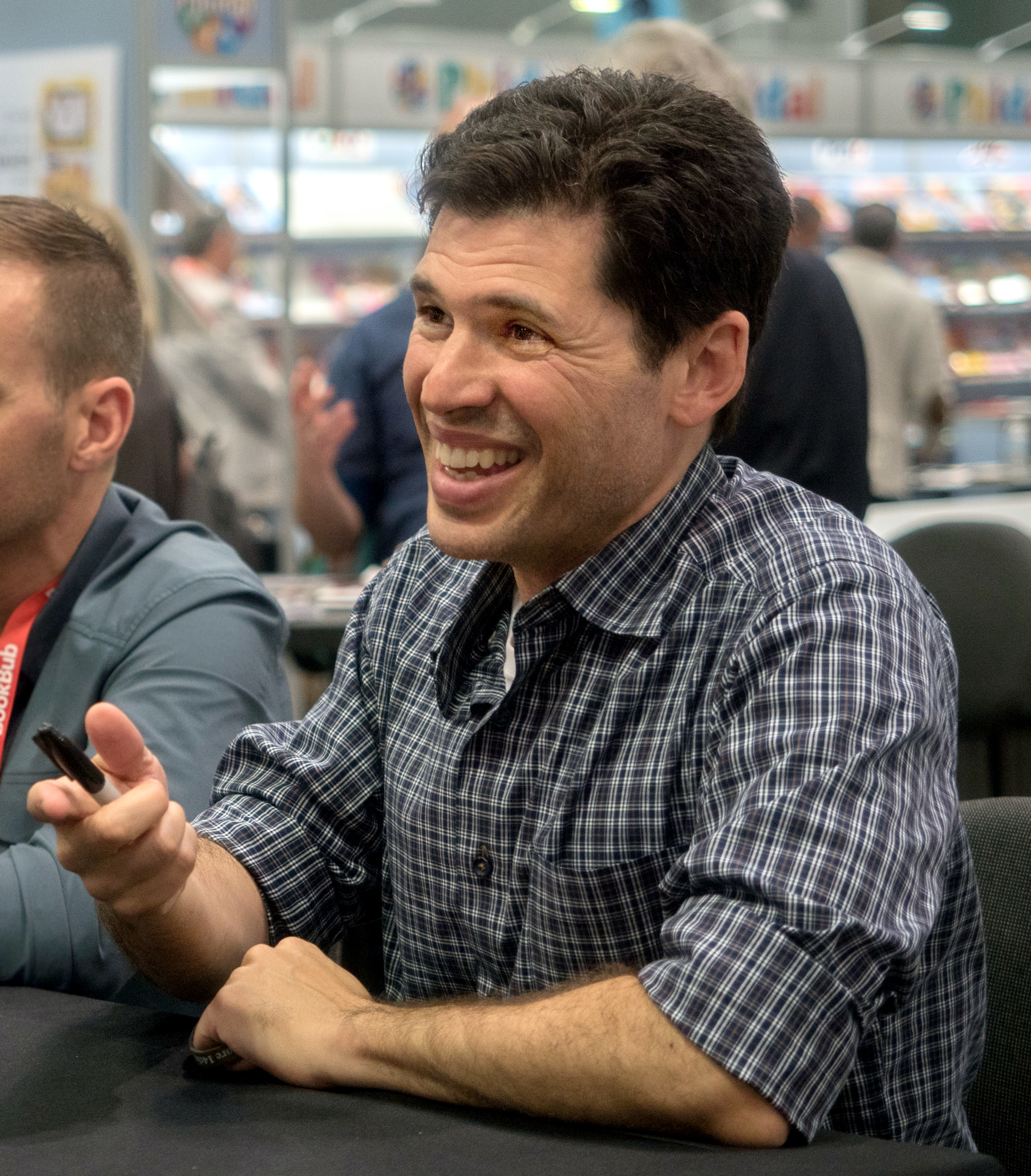
- Brooks in 2019
- Born: Maximillian Michael Brooks; May 22, 1972 (age 54); New York City, U.S.
- Education: Pitzer College (BA); American University
- Occupations: Writer; actor
- Spouse: Michelle Kholos (m. 2003)
- Children: 1
- Parents: Mel Brooks (father); Anne Bancroft (mother)
- Writing career
- Genres: Humor; horror

Maximilian Michael Brooks (born May 22, 1972) is an American writer and actor. He is the son of actors Mel Brooks and Anne Bancroft. Much of Brooks' writing focuses on zombie stories. He was a senior fellow at the Modern War Institute at West Point, New York.

== Early life ==
Maximillian Michael Brooks was born on May 22, 1972, in Manhattan, New York City. He is the son of actors Anne Bancroft and Mel Brooks. His father is Jewish, while his mother was an Italian-American Catholic.

Brooks is dyslexic. He recalled that while he was growing up:

...they didn't even call it a disability back then; it was just "laziness," "goofing off," "you're not trying hard enough." "You can do it but you don't want to do it" — that was a big one of my teachers. And my mother, one of the greatest, most successful actresses of her day, gave up her career, put her career on the shelf, to raise me, to be my educational advocate and to teach herself about dyslexia. ... She took, every year, all of my school books that I had to read to the Institute for the Blind and had them all read onto audio cassette so I could listen to my reading list. And if I hadn't been able to do that, I wouldn't have graduated high school. I can literally say that not only did my mother give me my life, she saved my life.

— NPR Fresh Air (2017)

Brooks attended Crossroads School in Santa Monica, California. He studied at Pitzer College in Claremont, California, where he earned a bachelor's degree in history. He also attended graduate school, studying film at American University in Washington, D.C.

== Career ==
=== Writing ===
From 2001 to 2003, Brooks was a member of the writing team at Saturday Night Live.

In 2003, Brooks wrote his first book, The Zombie Survival Guide, a fictional survival manual about zombies. In 2006, Brooks wrote the follow-up World War Z: An Oral History of the Zombie War, a novel on the same subject, set in the ten years following a zombie apocalypse. Paramount Pictures acquired the rights for a film adaptation, and Brad Pitt's production company, Plan B Entertainment, produced the film. In the October 2006 issue of Fangoria, Brooks stated that he would not be writing the screenplay for the motion picture, as he felt he was not an accomplished enough screenwriter to "do it right". J. Michael Straczynski wrote the first version of the screenplay.

Brooks wrote the introduction for the hardcover collected edition of Dynamite Entertainment's zombie miniseries Raise the Dead, released in 2007.

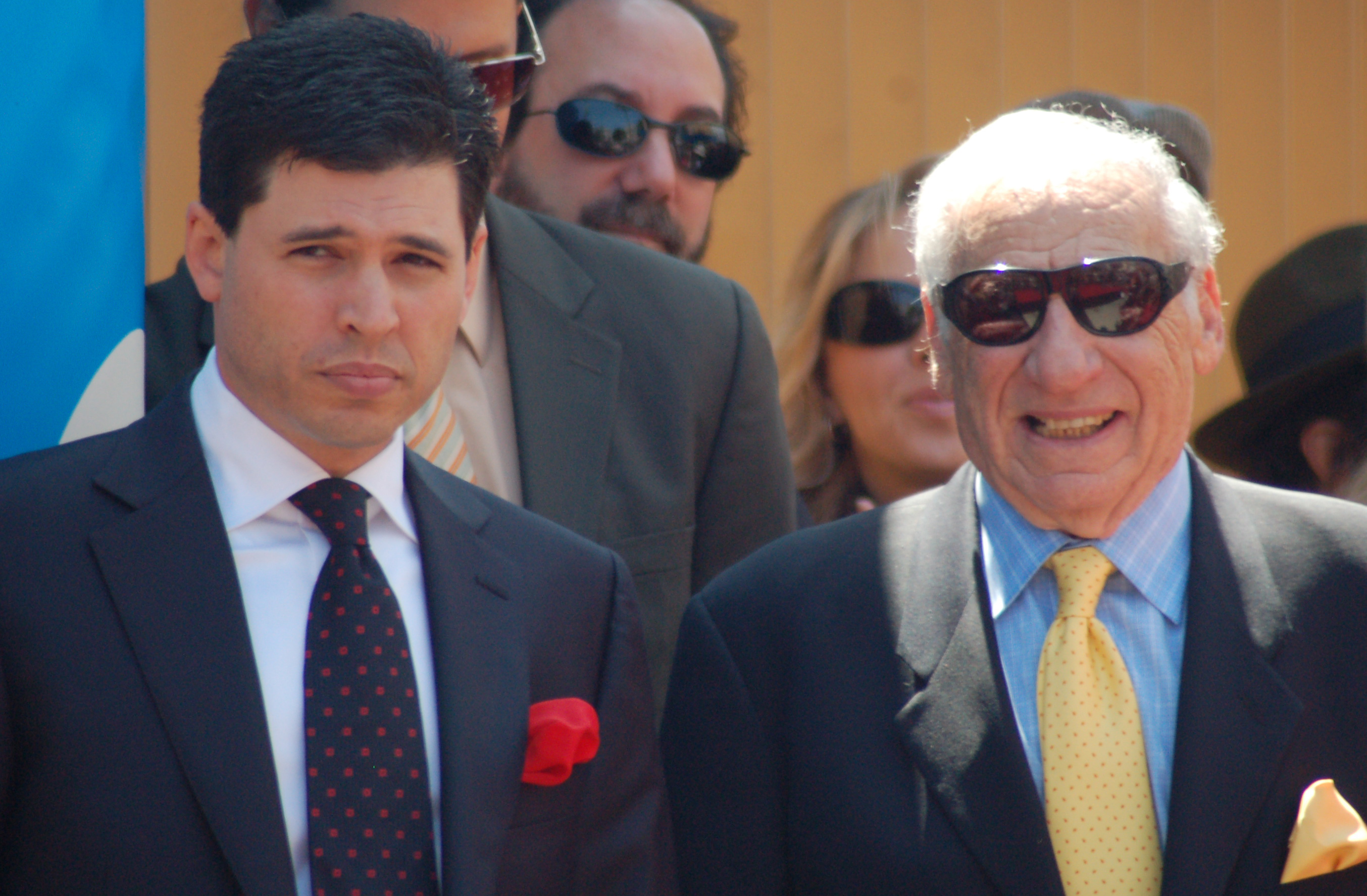
Max Brooks with father Mel in 2010

In 2010, Brooks wrote the IDW comic book mini-series G.I. Joe: Hearts & Minds.

In 2012, Brooks published Closure, Limited and Other Zombie Tales, featuring the story of that name from The New Dead, along with three other short stories set in the World War Z universe.

In 2014, Broadway Books published The Harlem Hellfighters, a graphic novel which portrays a fictionalized account of the African American 369th Infantry Regiment's experiences in World War I, written by Brooks and illustrated by Caanan White. Sony Pictures has purchased the rights to create a film of the novel, with Caleeb Pinkett and James Lassiter producing on behalf of Overbrook Entertainment.

He wrote the story for the 2016 film The Great Wall, starring Matt Damon.

In 2017 Brooks published a novel based on Minecraft, titled Minecraft: The Island, and in 2021, he published the sequel, Minecraft: The Mountain.

In August 2019, Brooks announced a new book, entitled Devolution: A Firsthand Account of the Rainier Sasquatch Massacre, about the cryptid Bigfoot. It was released on June 16, 2020.

In December 2025, Brooks announced a new book was in the works, tentatively titled The First Hundred Hours: A Story of Alien Invasion.

=== Acting and voice-over work ===
Brooks has a number of other creative credits. As an actor, he has been seen in Roseanne, To Be or Not to Be, Pacific Blue, and 7th Heaven. He also has a career voicing animation: his voice has been featured in the animated shows Batman Beyond, Buzz Lightyear of Star Command, Justice League, and All Dogs Go to Heaven: The Series. During the start of the third season of Lost Tapes, he was cast as himself in the zombie episode, telling the audience about how zombies come to be. He also appeared on the Spike TV series Deadliest Warrior, in which he represented the zombie team in the "Vampires vs. Zombies" episode, as one of the zombie experts along with Matt Mogk, founder of the Zombie Research Society.

== Personal life ==
Brooks has been married to playwright Michelle Kholos since 2003. They have a son, and live in Venice, Los Angeles. In October 2020, Brooks and his father appeared in a short video endorsing Joe Biden's presidential campaign.

== Filmography ==
Year	Title	Role	Notes
1983	To Be or Not to Be	Rifka's Son	Film
1992	The Public Eye	Teen at Thompson Street	Film
1992	Roseanne	Snarky Customer	Episode: "Terms of Estrangement"
1997	Pacific Blue	Marty Rosen	Episode: "Avenging Angel"
1999	7th Heaven	Waiter	Episode: "It Happened One Night"
1999	Melrose Place	Messenger	Episode: "How Amanda Got Her Groove Back"
1999	The Wild Thornberrys	Lead Dog	Voice, episode: "Polar Opposites"
2000	Roughnecks: Starship Troopers Chronicles	Lt. Bernstein	Voice, episode: "Swarm"
2000	Godzilla: The Series	Uncredited voice	Episode: "Underground Movement"
2000	Batman Beyond	Howard Groote, Drew	Voice, 6 episodes
2000	Buzz Lightyear of Star Command	Tech, Ranger, Punk-Goon	Voice, 2 episodes
2001	Justice League	Howie	Voice, episode: "Secret Origins"
2004	Seen		Short film
2010	Satan Hates You	Reporter	Film
2010	Lost Tapes	Himself	Episode: "Zombies"
2011	Deadliest Warrior	Himself	Episode: "Vampires vs. Zombies"

== Bibliography ==
=== Prose ===
- The Zombie Survival Guide (2003)
- World War Z (2006)
- Closure, Limited and Other Zombie Tales (2011)
- Minecraft: The Island (2017)
- Devolution (2020) Nominated for Locus Award's Best Horror Novel in 2021.
- Minecraft: The Mountain (2021)
- Minecraft: The Village (2023)
- Tiger Chair: A Short Story (2024)

=== Comics ===
- The Zombie Survival Guide: Recorded Attacks (2009)
- G.I. Joe: Hearts and Minds (2010)
- The Harlem Hellfighters (2014)
- The Extinction Parade (2014)
- A More Perfect Union (2016)
- Germ Warfare: A Very Graphic History (2019)
