= World War Z (film) =

2013 film by Marc Forster

- Theatrical release poster
- Directed by: Marc Forster
- Screenplay by: Matthew Michael Carnahan; Drew Goddard; Damon Lindelof
- Story by: Matthew Michael Carnahan; J. Michael Straczynski
- Based on: World War Z by Max Brooks
- Produced by: Brad Pitt; Dede Gardner; Jeremy Kleiner; Ian Bryce
- Starring: Brad Pitt; Mireille Enos; James Badge Dale; Peter Capaldi
- Cinematography: Ben Seresin (Note: Robert Richardson was initially hired for this role, but departed the production abruptly in order to film Django Unchained (2012), leaving Newton Thomas Sigel as replacement to finish principal photography. Ben Seresin was later brought on for the extensive reshoots. At one point, Richardson was going to be given sole credit, but, upon learning that the film's color grading had been significantly altered, he asked for his name to be removed from the film, with Seresin receiving the final credit.)
- Edited by: Roger Barton; Matt Chessé
- Music by: Marco Beltrami
- Production companies: Skydance Productions; Hemisphere Media Capital; GK Films; Plan B Entertainment; 2DUX²
- Distributed by: Paramount Pictures
- Release dates: June 2, 2013 (Empire Cinema); June 21, 2013 (United States)
- Running time: 116 minutes
- Country: United States
- Language: English
- Budget: $190–269 million
- Box office: $540 million

World War Z is a 2013 American action horror film starring Brad Pitt as Gerry Lane, a former United Nations investigator who travels the world seeking a solution for a sudden zombie apocalypse. Inspired by the 2006 novel by Max Brooks, the film was directed by Marc Forster, with a screenplay by Matthew Michael Carnahan, Drew Goddard, and Damon Lindelof, from a story by Carnahan and J. Michael Straczynski. The supporting cast includes Mireille Enos, James Badge Dale, Peter Capaldi, Ruth Negga, and Matthew Fox.

Pitt's Plan B Entertainment secured the film rights to Brooks' novel in 2007, and Straczynski was approached to write and Forster to direct. In 2009, Carnahan was hired to rewrite the script. With a planned December 2012 release and a projected budget of $125 million, filming began in July 2011 in Malta, before moving to Glasgow in August and Budapest in October. The production suffered setbacks; in June 2012 the release date was pushed back and Lindelof was hired to rewrite the third act. He did not have time to finish the script, so Goddard was brought in to finish the rewrite. The crew returned to Budapest for seven weeks of additional shooting in September and October 2012, ballooning the budget to a reported $190 million, although some publications have listed it as high as $269 million.

World War Z premiered in London on June 2, 2013, and was theatrically released by Paramount Pictures in the United States on June 21. Reviews were generally positive, with praise for Pitt's performance and for the film as a revival of the zombie genre, but criticism of what some felt was an anti-climax and a lack of faithfulness to the source material. World War Z grossed over $540 million, making it the highest-grossing zombie film of all time, though a minor commercial success, taking into consideration its $190–269 million budget. A sequel was first announced shortly after the film's release, but was shelved in February 2019 reportedly due to budget issues and China's ban on zombie films, before being revived by 2026 with Edward Berger attached to direct.

== Plot ==
Former United Nations investigator Gerald "Gerry" Lane, his wife, Karin, and their two daughters, Rachel and Connie, are caught in traffic in downtown Philadelphia when a zombie outbreak hits. Escaping the ensuing chaos, they travel to Newark and rescue Tommy, a young boy whose family hunkered down in their apartment and refused to leave. They are rescued by a helicopter sent by Thierry Umutoni, the UN deputy secretary-general.

The group is then taken to a US Navy vessel stationed in the Atlantic Ocean, where a team of scientists studies the outbreak. Among them is virologist Andrew Fassbach, who believes that the plague is caused by a virus and that finding its origin is crucial for developing a vaccine. Faced with the threat of his family's eviction from the vessel, Gerry reluctantly agrees to assist Fassbach.

Gerry, Fassbach, and a Navy SEAL escort fly to Camp Humphreys in South Korea, from where the first report of zombies was received. Upon arrival, the group is attacked by zombies, causing a panicked Fassbach to slip on the plane ramp and accidentally shoot himself dead. The team is saved by US soldiers stationed at the camp, and Gerry discovers that the infection was brought to the base by its doctor. A defective CIA officer imprisoned there guides Gerry towards Israel, where the Mossad has established a secure area.

In Jerusalem, Gerry encounters Jurgen Warmbrunn, a high-ranking Mossad official, who mentions that intercepted communications of Indian troops fighting zombies is what led Israel to set up defenses. Jerusalem has protected itself by constructing a massive wall, and allowing both Israeli and Palestinian refugees to seek shelter within the city. However, the refugees' loud celebrations attract zombies, which instinctively form massive castells to overcome the wall. As the city becomes overrun, Warmbrunn instructs Israeli soldiers to accompany Gerry back to his plane. Amidst the mayhem, Gerry observes zombies ignoring an elderly man and a malnourished boy. When one of Gerry's escorts, "Segen", is bitten on her hand, he amputates it to prevent her from turning into a zombie. Together, they escape on Belarus Airways Flight 160.

Gerry redirects the plane to a World Health Organization (WHO) medical research facility in Cardiff. During the journey, a stowaway zombie attacks a flight attendant, which later attacks the passengers. To eliminate the zombies, Gerry detonates a grenade to breach the cabin and expel them, resulting in the plane's crash landing. With Gerry presumed killed, his family is relocated from the carrier to Nova Scotia.

Gerry and Segen survive the crash, although Gerry is trapped in his seat and has sustained injuries. Segen comes to Gerry's aid, and together, they reach the Cardiff facility. Exhausted and wounded, Gerry loses consciousness and wakes up three days later, having been treated by the WHO staff. Sharing his observations, Gerry deduces that the zombies ignore the sick or injured, as they are not suitable hosts for spreading the infection. He proposes injecting healthy individuals with a curable pathogen as a form of "camouflage" against the zombies. The pathogen samples are in a section of the WHO facility infested with zombies. Gerry, Segen, and the head doctor attempt to sneak through the lab but accidentally alert the zombies. The three are separated in a chaotic chase, with Segen and the doctor forced to retreat. Gerry, the only one able to reach the samples, does so but is unable to leave because of a lone zombie blocking his path. Out of options, Gerry tests his theory by injecting himself with a pathogen. As he opens the door, his theory is proven correct: the zombie ignores him completely.

Gerry and Segen reach a secure area in Freeport, Nova Scotia, where Gerry reunites with Karin and the kids, including Tommy, who, having been orphaned, is unofficially adopted by Gerry and Karin. A vaccine is created, from a hybridised meningitis strain with components of smallpox and swine flu, serving as stealth against the zombies, enabling civilians to evacuate infected regions safely and empowering the military to combat the zombies more effectively.

== Cast ==
- Brad Pitt as Gerald "Gerry" Lane, a retired United Nations investigator who is recalled to duty to help search for a cure for the zombie pandemic
- Mireille Enos as Karin Lane, Gerry's dedicated and supportive wife.
- Daniella Kertesz as "Segen" (referred to by military rank rather than by name), an Israeli soldier who Gerry meets during his mission.
- James Badge Dale as Captain Speke, a U.S. Army Ranger stationed at Camp Humphreys in South Korea.
- David Morse as an ex-CIA officer imprisoned at Camp Humphreys for assisting North Korea's fight against the zombies
- Fana Mokoena as Thierry Umutoni, an Under-Secretary-General of the United Nations, Gerry's former boss who enlists him to escort the virologist
- David Andrews as Captain Mullenaro, the U.S. Navy official in charge of the vessel to which the Lane family is brought
- Sterling Jerins as Constance Lane, Gerry and Karin's younger daughter
- Abigail Hargrove as Rachel Lane, Gerry and Karin's older daughter
- Peter Capaldi as Brit, a W.H.O. doctor in Wales
- Pierfrancesco Favino as Javier, the lead W.H.O. doctor in Wales
- Ruth Negga as Dr. Kelly, a W.H.O. doctor in Wales
- Moritz Bleibtreu as Dr. Ryan, a W.H.O. doctor in Wales
- Ludi Boeken as Jurgen Warmbrunn, a high-ranking Mossad official
- Grégory Fitoussi as Daniel, the C-130 pilot who flies Gerry from South Korea to Israel

In addition, Elyes Gabel plays Andrew Fassbach, a redshirt virologist whom Gerry escorted to South Korea. Matthew Fox appears as a crew member of the Navy vessel the Lanes stay on, although most of his scenes were cut from the final film.

== Production ==
=== Development ===
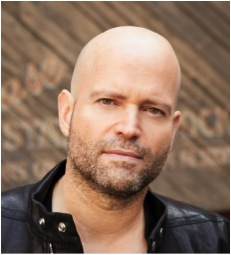
Marc Forster was hired to direct the film in 2008.

After a bidding war with Appian Way Productions, Brad Pitt's Plan B Entertainment secured the screen rights to Max Brooks' novel in 2007. The first draft of the screenplay was written by J. Michael Straczynski, who identified the challenge in adapting the work as "creating a main character out of a book that reads as a UN report on the zombie wars." Marc Forster signed on to direct, and described the film as reminiscent of 1970s conspiracy thrillers like All the President's Men (1974). Straczynski identified the 2002 spy film The Bourne Identity as an appropriate comparison, and noted that the film would have a large international scope that maintained the political emphasis. When asked about his involvement with the film, Brooks stated he had "zero control", but favored a role for Pitt, and expressed approval for Straczynski as screenwriter. Brooks said: "I can't give it away, but Straczynski found a way to tie it all together. The last draft I read was amazing."

An early script was leaked onto the internet in March 2008, leading to a review by Ain't It Cool News that called it "[not] just a good adaptation of a difficult book [but] a genre-defining piece of work that could well see us all arguing about whether or not a zombie movie qualifies as 'Best Picture' material". The script was well-enough respected to find a place on the 2007 Black List of "most liked" screenplays not yet produced. The Ain't It Cool News review also noted the film appears stylistically similar to Children of Men (2006), following Gerry Lane as he travels the post-war world and interviews survivors of the zombie war who are "starting to wonder if survival is a victory of any kind."

In December 2008, Straczynski said he hoped the film would begin production by the start of 2009, but, in March 2009, Forster said the script was still in development and he was not sure if World War Z would be his next film. Later in March, rumors surfaced that production offices were set up and the film was in early pre-production. Then, in June, Forster told an interviewer that the film would be delayed, stating that its script still needed a lot of development and was "still far from realization".

Brooks revealed that the script was being re-written by Matthew Michael Carnahan in July 2009. He said he believed this "show[ed] [the producer's] confidence in this project" because of the amount of money that was being invested in it. Paramount Pictures and UTV Motion Pictures announced at the 2010 San Diego Comic-Con that Forster was set as director, and Pitt was confirmed to be playing the lead role. In March 2011, it was reported on Vulture that Paramount was searching for a co-financier, and would likely pull the plug on the adaptation without one. The article also stated that "an eleventh-hour effort is being made to court frequent Paramount co-financier David Ellison." A week later, it was reported that "hot and heavy talks are going on with David Ellison's Skydance Productions and as many as two other financiers."

=== Pre-production ===
Pre-production began in April 2011, with Robert Richardson being announced as the cinematographer and Nigel Phelps as production designer. In the same month, it was reported that filming locations would include Pinewood Studios and London, England. Also in April, Mireille Enos was cast as Gerry Lane's wife and mother of their two children.

In June, James Badge Dale entered negotiations to join the film as an American soldier who tries to alert the authorities to the zombie threat. Matthew Fox and Ed Harris entered talks, and Julia Levy-Boeken was set to join the film. It was reported that filming would begin in Malta the next month and would encompass Valletta and the Three Cities. A few days later, it was reported that filming would also take place in Glasgow, Scotland, in August, the city doubling for Philadelphia, "with false shop fronts being constructed and American cars on the roads." Glasgow was reportedly chosen after "many months looking for the perfect city centre location to play an important part in the film." Philadelphia was passed on due to "uncertainties about state tax credits for filmmakers." Filming was originally planned to take place in Royal Tunbridge Wells, England before moving to Glasgow.

Later in June, visual effects house Cinesite announced that it would work on "a significant amount of shots". At the end of the month, it was reported that, despite previous reports, neither Fox nor Harris would be starring in the film; Fox had a scheduling conflict stemming from his prior commitment to star in Alex Cross with Tyler Perry at Summit Entertainment, though he was later spotted filming scenes for World War Z in Falmouth, Cornwall.

=== Filming ===
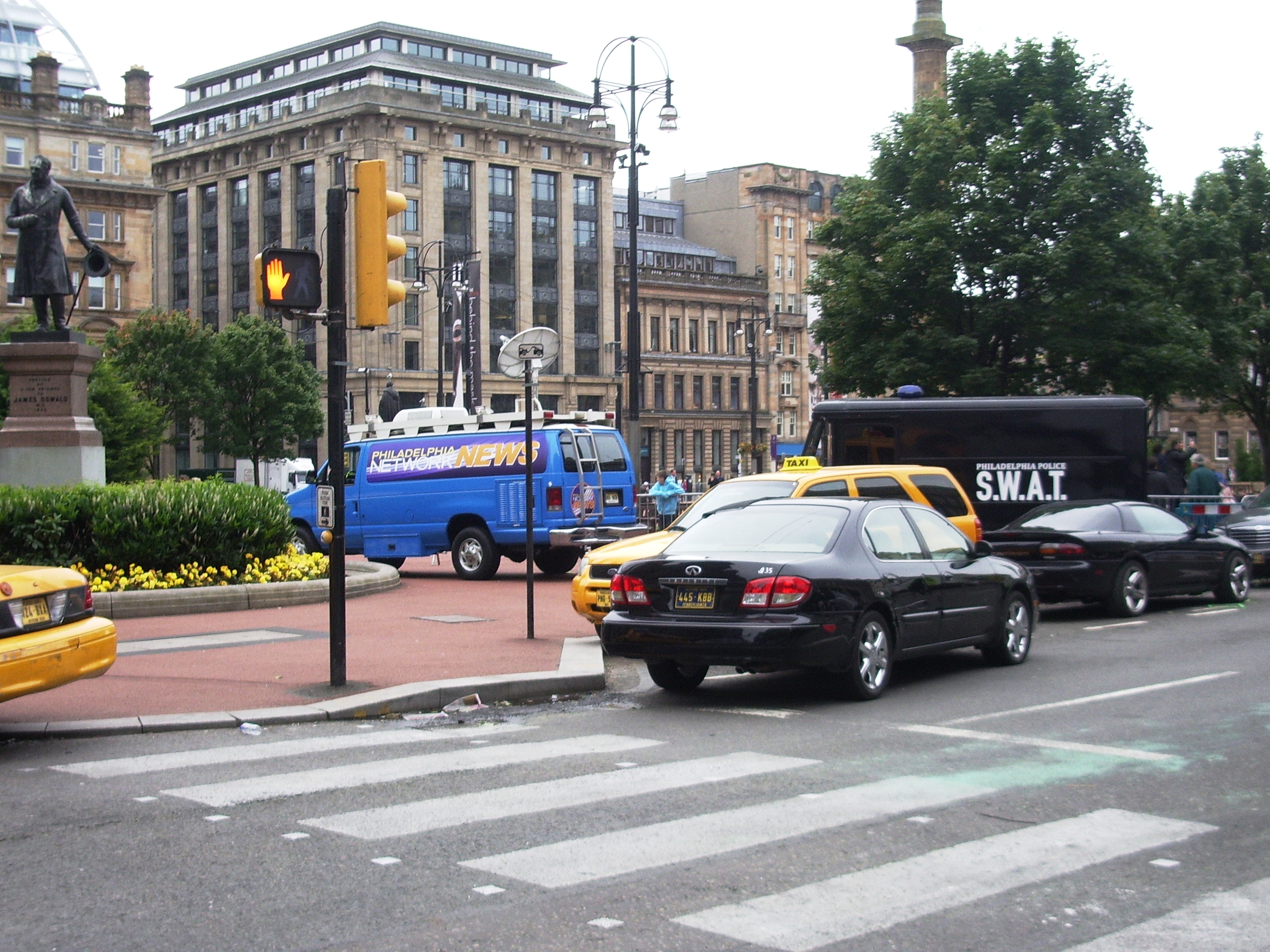
Filming in George Square, Glasgow, August 2011

With a reported budget of over $125 million, World War Z began principal photography in July 2011 in Malta, with the first images of production being released a few days later. Filming was scheduled to move to Glasgow in August, with the production company looking to recruit 2,000 local extras for the shoot. At least 3,000 people showed up at a casting call in Glasgow on July 9, hoping for the opportunity to appear in a scene set in a financial district in Philadelphia. Scenes were also shot in Falmouth, Cornwall. Also in July, actor Elyes Gabel was cast as a character named Fassbach. Despite opposition from residents, some scenes were shot on the Heygate Estate in South London.

The aircraft involved in the plane crash, depicted as Belarus Airways Flight 160, was an Airbus A310-304, it operated by Hi Fly and was registered as CS-TEX, and painted into a white livery. The scenes involving the plane taking off from Israel were shot at Malta International Airport in Luqa, Malta, which would stand in for Jerusalem International Airport.

In August, Bryan Cranston entered negotiations to join the film in a "small but flashy" role, but he ultimately had to drop out due to scheduling conflicts. Also in August, filming was set to take place along a road on the perimeter of the Grangemouth Refinery in Grangemouth, Scotland, the location chosen for the length of the road, which was crucial to the shot. A few days later, Paramount announced the film would be released on December 21, 2012. Later in the same month, filming began in Glasgow. The location manager for the film said Glasgow had been chosen because of its architecture, wide roads, and grid layout. Scenes were also filmed aboard the Royal Fleet Auxiliary ship RFA Argus, before the Glasgow shoot. The ship was turned into the "USS Madison", which involved stenciling a new pennant number on the funnel and adding some "Americanism" to the superstructure. Steven McMenemy, the Argus's navigator, said: "The ship sailed and we were joined by four small catamarans which were being used as markers for the cameras, so that warships could be added in with CGI later." In October, David Morse was cast as a "prisoner living in an abandoned jail."

The filmmakers initially intended to film a climactic battle scene set in Russia, and the crew moved to Budapest to film it there. Filming in Budapest commenced on the evening of October 10. That morning, the Hungarian Counter Terrorism Centre raided the warehouse where guns had been delivered for use as filming props. The 85 assault rifles, sniper rifles, and handguns had been flown into Budapest overnight on a private aircraft, but the film's producers had failed to clear the delivery with Hungarian authorities, and, while the import documentation indicated the weapons had been disabled, all were found to be fully functional. On February 10, 2012, the charges were dropped after investigators were unable to identify exactly which "organization or person" had "ownership rights"; therefore they could not "establish which party was criminally liable".

Principal photography wrapped on November 4, 2011.

=== Post-production ===
In June 2012, screenwriter Damon Lindelof was hired to rewrite the film's third act, with reshoots scheduled to begin that September or October. He was brought in as a new set of eyes not burdened by all the history of the script and said: "[Brad Pitt] took me through how excited he was when he read the book, what was exciting for him, the geopolitical aspect of it. But when we started working on the script, a lot of that stuff had to fall away for the story to come together." Lindelof explained that there were inefficiencies in the script in relation to the shooting that started before the script was finalized, making the ending "abrupt and incoherent", and that the film was missing a large chunk of footage. He presented two options to executives, who ultimately chose to shoot 30 to 40 minutes of additional footage to change the ending. However, Lindelof did not have time to script the new ending, so in July Paramount hired his Lost partner Drew Goddard to finish the work. Goddard later told Creative Screenwriting: "To me the big lesson of World War Z was that Paramount, Plan B and Brad Pitt simply said, 'Let's take the time to make this movie the best version of the movie before we put it on the screen for audience.' [sic] That doesn't happen a lot. A lot of times they just throw the movie out there and say, 'We'll make all our money opening weekend and then the movie will go away.' I came away from it thinking, 'Why don't we do this on more movies?'"

When all scenes of the Airbus A310-304 were shot at Malta, the shots of the plane taking off were digitally altered to have the aircraft be painted with the "Belarus Airways" livery, and the plane crash scene was done through CGI.

The re-shoots, coupled with other overages, caused the film's budget to balloon to around $190 million, which shocked Paramount president Marc Evans. Several of the scenes shot in Budapest, including a large-scale battle with the zombies in Moscow's Red Square, were dropped from the final cut in order to water down the film's political undertones and steer it towards a more generally friendly summer blockbuster. The climactic battle scene in Russia, for which there was 12 minutes of footage, reportedly had Pitt's character fighting through zombies more like "a warrior hero" than "the sympathetic family man" of the earlier acts. The second-unit director, Simon Crane, said: "It wasn't character-driven anymore... [The filmmakers] really needed to think about what they wanted to do with the third act." Additional scenes were also filmed at the Pfizer building at Discovery Park in Sandwich, Kent, for scenes where Gerry tries to find a cure for the zombie pandemic.

In March 2013, it was reported that Paramount changed a scene in the film, in which the characters speculate that the zombie outbreak originated in mainland China, in hopes of landing a distribution deal in the country. An executive familiar with upcoming releases in China told TheWrap in June that a cut of the film was rejected by Chinese censors. A Paramount executive contended that he was "unaware of any rejection", explaining: "We have submitted one version and have yet to receive a response."

== Music ==
In December 2011, it was reported that Marco Beltrami had signed on to score World War Z. In May 2013, the British rock band Muse posted a video on their YouTube channel that hinted they would be contributing to the soundtrack of the film; the songs "The 2nd Law: Isolated System" and an instrumental version of "Follow Me", both taken from their 2012 album The 2nd Law, were used. On June 18, 2013, Warner Bros. Records released the soundtrack album for the film, which featured the original score composed by Beltrami.

== Release ==
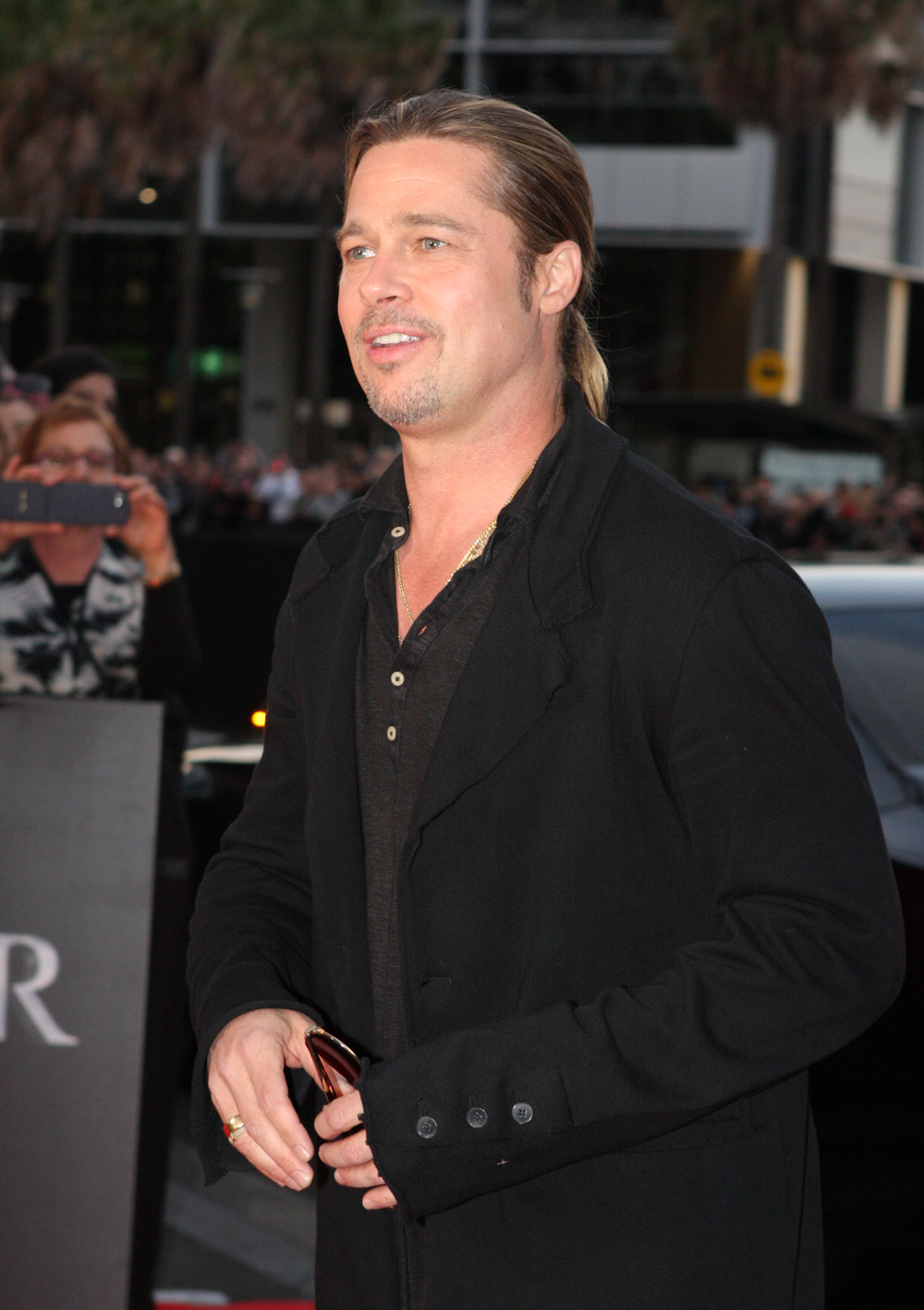
Actor Brad Pitt attending the Sydney premiere of the film

World War Z was initially scheduled for release by Paramount and Skydance on December 21, 2012, but in March 2012 it was pushed back to June 21, 2013, with Paramount electing to release Jack Reacher on the December 2012 date. Its world premiere was held at the Empire Cinema in Leicester Square, London, on June 2, 2013. On June 6, Brad Pitt attended screenings of the film in Atlanta, Philadelphia, Chicago, and Austin, all on the same day. The film was released at Glasgow's Grosvenor Cinema in Ashton Lane on June 19, two days before its global launch, and opened the 35th Moscow International Film Festival the next day. In all, Paramount spent $160 million marketing the film worldwide.

=== Home media ===
The film was released on Blu-ray and DVD on September 24, 2013. The Blu-ray release includes an unrated alternate cut of the film that features seven minutes of additional footage, most of which consists of additional moments of violence and suspense in the action scenes.

== Reception ==
=== Box office ===
The film grossed $202.41 million in North America and $337.6 million in other territories, for a worldwide total of $540 million. Variety called it a "bona-fide box office hit", although Deadline Hollywood later said it "barely broke even".

In North America, the film earned $25.2 million on its opening day, including $3.6 million from Thursday night and midnight shows. It went on to earn $66.4 million its opening weekend, finishing second to Monsters University at the box office. This was, at the time, the second-largest opening weekend for a film that did not debut in first place (behind The Day After Tomorrow (2004) with $85.8 million), the largest opening weekend for a film starring Brad Pitt, and the sixth-largest opening among films released in June.

In other territories, the film earned $5.7 million on its opening day (Thursday, June 20, 2013), and $45.8 million its opening weekend, ranking third.

=== Critical response ===
On the review aggregator website Rotten Tomatoes, 67% of 277 critics' reviews are positive, with an average rating of 6.2/10. The website's consensus reads: "It's uneven and diverges from the source book, but World War Z still brings smart, fast-moving thrills and a solid performance from Brad Pitt to the zombie genre." Metacritic, which uses a weighted average, assigned the film a score of 63 out of 100, based on 46 critics, indicating "generally favorable" reviews. Audiences polled by CinemaScore gave the film an average grade of "B+" on an A+ to F scale.

Richard Roeper of the Chicago Sun-Times gave the film a 3.5 out of 4, saying: "It's entertaining as hell" and provides "nearly non-stop action". Peter Travers of Rolling Stone gave the film a 3 out of 4, saying that "the suspense is killer". Henry Barnes of The Guardian considered the film an "attempt at large-scale seriousness" in the zombie genre that resulted in a "punchy, if conventional action thriller." Writing for Variety, Scott Foundas found the film a "surprisingly smart, gripping and imaginative addition to the zombie-movie canon", which shows "few visible signs of the massive rewrites, reshoots and other post-production patchwork." Todd McCarthy of The Hollywood Reporter opined that "Brad Pitt delivers a capable performance in an immersive apocalyptic spectacle about a global zombie uprising." A. O. Scott of The New York Times said, "[It] does not try to extend the boundaries of commercial entertainment but does what it can to find interesting ways to pass the time within them." Kenneth Turan of the Los Angeles Times remarked that "World War Z plays a bit like a series of separate films and the juncture where the new final act was grafted onto the proceedings is unmistakable, but unless you knew about the film's troubled past, you'd never guess it existed."

In a negative review, Joe Neumaier of the New York Daily News said that World War Z "is no summer thriller. It's an anemic actioner that fosters excitement like dead limbs as it lumbers toward a conclusion." Robbie Collin of The Daily Telegraph thought the film had been affected by its troubled development, observing that "the final product has an elaborate uselessness about it", and the film has "no heart to be found amid the guts." Alonso Duralde of TheWrap said: "For all its effectiveness at portraying the horror of possible human extinction, the film's actual humans are so soulless that this could just as well be the movie version of the video game Plants vs. Zombies."

Rotten Tomatoes lists the film on its 100 Best Zombie Movies, Ranked by Tomatometer.

=== Accolades ===
Year	Award	Category	Recipient(s)	Result	Ref.
2013	Fright Meter Awards	Best Special Effects	World War Z	Nominated	
2013	Golden Schmoes Awards	Best Horror Movie of the Year	World War Z	Nominated	
2013	Golden Schmoes Awards	Biggest Surprise of the Year	World War Z	Nominated	
2013	Golden Trailer Awards	Summer 2013 Blockbuster Trailer	World War Z	Nominated	
2013	Golden Trailer Awards	Best Summer Block Buster 2013 TV Spot	World War Z	Nominated	
2013	Hollywood Film Awards	Hollywood Movie Award	Marc Forster	Nominated	
2013	IGN Summer Movie Awards	Best Horror Movie	World War Z	Nominated	
2013	Key Art Awards	Best Horror Movie	World War Z	Nominated	
2013	Rondo Hatton Classic Horror Awards	Best Audio/Visual Technique	Paramount Pictures, Big Picture; Entertainment	Nominated	
2013	Satellite Awards	Best Visual Effects	Andrew R. Jones, Jessica Norman, Matt Johnson, Scott Farrar	Nominated	
2013	Teen Choice Awards	Choice Summer Movie: Action/Adventure	World War Z	Nominated	
2014	40th Saturn Awards	Best Thriller Film	World War Z	Won	
2014	35th Young Artist Awards	Best Leading Young Actress in a Feature Film	Abigail Hargrove	Nominated	

== Video games ==
A tie-in mobile game was developed by Phosphor Games Studio and released for iOS in May 2013. The game is a spin-off from the movie, set in Denver, Kyoto and Paris and features an original cast of characters.

In April 2019, Saber Interactive released a co-operative third-person shooter game of the same name for PlayStation 4, Windows PC, Xbox One and Nintendo Switch, which includes missions set around the world in New York, Jerusalem, Moscow, Tokyo, and Marseille.

== Future ==
According to a report in the Los Angeles Times in January 2012, at that time Marc Forster and Paramount Pictures both viewed "World War Z as a trilogy that would have the grounded, gun-metal realism of, say, Damon's Jason Bourne series tethered to the unsettling end-times vibe of AMC's The Walking Dead." Plans for future installments were shelved for a time due to the film's production troubles. However, in June 2013, after the successful opening of the film, Paramount announced it was moving ahead with a sequel. In December, it was reported that J. A. Bayona had been chosen to direct the film, and in May 2014 Steven Knight was set to write the script. In May 2015, it was announced the sequel would be released on June 9, 2017. However, in January 2016, Paramount announced director Bayona had left the project due to other commitments.

Variety reported in August 2016 that the sequel was not yet in production, but David Fincher had entered negotiations to be the director, and in April 2017 it was reported Fincher was close to a deal to sign on. On February 8, 2017, Paramount announced the sequel had still not started filming and would not be released until 2018, or possibly even 2019.

Fincher was confirmed by Paramount as the director of the sequel in June 2017, with Brad Pitt to play again the role of Gerry Lane. Filming was slated to start in fall of 2018, though this later changed due to Fincher's involvement in the television series Mindhunter. In October 2018, producer Dede Gardner confirmed the sequel would begin filming in June 2019, and there were several months of pre-production and staffing for principal photography in five countries, but, in February 2019, the film was cancelled. A source quoted by The Hollywood Reporter said the Chinese government's ban on films featuring zombies or ghosts was the single major reason that Paramount canceled the sequel.

At CinemaCon 2026, Paramount announced that a new World War Z film was in development. Contemporary coverage did not identify a director, writer, cast, or release date. In September 2026, Edward Berger was announced as director with Pitt officially returning.
