= World War Z =

2006 novel by Max Brooks

- First edition cover
- Author: Max Brooks
- Language: English
- Genre: Horror, post-apocalyptic fiction
- Published: September 12, 2006
- Publisher: Crown
- Publication place: United States
- Media type: Print (hardback and paperback), e-book, audiobook
- Pages: 342
- ISBN: 0-307-34660-9
- OCLC: 65340967
- Dewey Decimal: 813/.6 22
- LC Class: PS3602.R6445 W67 2006
- Preceded by: The Zombie Survival Guide

World War Z: An Oral History of the Zombie War is a 2006 zombie apocalyptic horror novel written by American author Max Brooks. It is broken into eight chapters—"Warnings", "Blame", "The Great Panic", "Turning the Tide", "Home Front USA", "Around the World, and Above", "Total War", and "Good-Byes"—and features a collection of individual accounts told to and recorded by an agent of the United Nations Postwar Commission, following a devastating global conflict against a zombie plague. The "interviews" detail the experiences of survivors from different walks of life and all over the world, including Antarctica and outer space, and explain the social, political, religious, economic, and environmental changes that have resulted from the crisis.

World War Z is a follow up to Brooks' fictional survival manual The Zombie Survival Guide (2003), but its tone is more serious. It was inspired by The Good War: An Oral History of World War Two (1984) by Studs Terkel, and by the zombie films of George A. Romero. Brooks used World War Z to comment on government ineptitude and U.S. isolationism, while also examining survivalism and uncertainty. The novel was a commercial hit and well received by most critics.

Its 2007 audiobook version, performed by a full cast including Alan Alda, Mark Hamill, and John Turturro, won an Audie Award. A loosely based film adaptation, directed by Marc Forster and starring Brad Pitt, was released in 2013, and a video game of the same name, based on the 2013 film, was released in 2019 by Saber Interactive.

== Plot ==
The novel is framed around a series of interviews conducted by a fictionalized version of Max Brooks, author of The Zombie Survival Guide. Within the fictional universe of World War Z, The Zombie Survival Guide is known as the Civilian Survival Guide and was widely circulated among the populace. The fictionalized Brooks is an agent for the United Nations Postwar Commission, as he travels the world gathering recollections a decade after events known as the "Zombie War".

The pandemic begins in the early 21st century, with the infection of a boy in a village in Dachang, China. The release of the virus, referred to as "Solanum" in The Zombie Survival Guide, is implied to have been somehow caused or released by construction of the Three Gorges Dam. However, the origin of the virus is never explicitly described. The Politburo initially covers up the outbreak by engineering a military crisis with Taiwan to avoid appearing weak internationally. Nevertheless, thousands of infected people quickly spread the virus outside of China through emigration, human trafficking, and the organ trade. Once people are infected, the virus rapidly spreads through the body to the brain, causing fever, neurological deterioration, coma, and death within a few hours before reanimating the corpse after about a day. The reanimated brain can function without a heartbeat or breathing, turning the body into a mindless entity driven by instincts and hunger.

The virus spreads to Cape Town, South Africa, where the first major public outbreak occurs, leading to the virus initially being dubbed "African rabies". A Mossad agent publishes a report detailing the undead threat and recommending countermeasures, but Israel is the only country to take it seriously. The USA, in particular, is overconfident and distracted by an upcoming election, responding only by deploying small special operations teams to temporarily contain isolated outbreaks. Israel, meanwhile, responds by enacting a policy of voluntary quarantine in which it ceases occupying the Palestinian territories, evacuates Jerusalem, and constructs a wall along the demarcation line established in 1967; the government also offers asylum to any Palestinian living in the formerly occupied territories, and any Palestinian whose family previously resided in Israel. These policies spark a civil war by enraging the Israeli religious right, though the uprising is eventually suppressed by the military. Worldwide, a widely-marketed placebo vaccine named Phalanx creates a false sense of security. This period later becomes known as the "Great Denial".

The following spring, an unnamed journalist reveals the uselessness of Phalanx and that the infected are essentially walking corpses, sparking a crisis later dubbed the "Great Panic" in which global order collapses, with rioting, breakdown of essential services, and indiscriminate culling of citizens killing more people than the zombies themselves. Russia imposes a decimation of its military to end rampant mutinies. Ukraine uses VX gas on refugees and its own citizens in an attempt to weed out the infected. Iran and Pakistan go to war and destroy each other in a brief nuclear exchange over a refugee crisis. In an attempt to repair public trust, the U.S. military stages a high-profile battle in Yonkers. However, conventional warfare tactics prove futile against the overwhelming horde of zombies, and the military is routed on live television. The catastrophe causes the U.S. President to suffer a nervous breakdown, resulting in his unnamed Vice President and cabinet invoking Section 4 of the 25th Amendment and forcibly removing him from office.

Paul Redeker, a former intelligence consultant for the apartheid-era South African government, develops a drastic survival strategy that designates large groups of humans as unwitting bait, distracting the undead to give safe zones time to fortify themselves and build up resources. Most countries go on to adopt the controversial plan. The U.S. federal government and military evacuate west of the Rocky Mountains and establish a new capital in Honolulu. The International Space Station remains crewed by three astronauts who volunteer not to return to Earth; its commander observes miles-wide "mega swarms" of zombies stretching across Central Asia and the Great Plains. The fallout from the Iran–Pakistan War, as well as the millions of global fires sparked by the crisis, creates a nuclear winter. Knowing that zombies freeze solid in extreme cold, many ill-prepared North American civilians flee into the wilderness of northern Canada, where an estimated eleven million people die of disease, hypothermia, and starvation, with some undertaking cannibalism.

Four years later, a United Nations conference is held off the coast of Honolulu aboard the recommissioned USS Saratoga. Though many world leaders are content with simply waiting until the zombies decompose to reclaim their territory more easily, the U.S. declares its intention to go on the offensive to reclaim human dignity as the dominant species on Earth. Determined to lead by example, the U.S. military reinvents itself to more effectively combat zombies as, without a cure, every last one must be destroyed to end the pandemic. Fully automatic weapons and mechanized infantry are replaced by semi-automatic rifles and volley firing, and soldiers are retrained to aim for the head instead of at center mass, and maintain steady rates of fire. Troops are also equipped with body armor designed to protect from infection via zombie bites or bodily fluids, as well as the "Standard Infantry Entrenchment Tool" (colloquially known as the "lobotomizer" or "lobo"), a modernized entrenching tool designed to quickly destroy a zombie's brain. Other countries begin joining the Americans in their fight, with the United Kingdom constructing fortified, elevated motorways across Great Britain to enable easier travel while the hordes of undead are being cleared. A new martial art known as Mkunga Lalem, translating to "the Eel and the Sword", is invented specifically to fight zombies.

The contiguous United States is liberated three years after the Honolulu Conference. Global victory is declared after another two years upon the liberation of China, although the British military does not fully liberate London until three years after "Victory in China Day" due to its prioritization of low casualties. Russia, its armories badly depleted, is forced to heavily employ the use of outdated World War II-era equipment while waging a costly, brute-force two-front war. France, desiring to restore its national pride and reputation after its humiliating defeats in the Battle of France, Điện Biên Phủ, and the Algerian War, conducts its campaign of the war more aggressively than its Western allies. The U.S. President dies, implied to be from heart failure caused by extreme stress, toward the end of the war.

Ten years after Victory in China Day, the world is still heavily damaged but slowly recovering. Tens of millions of zombies remain active, mainly on the ocean floor, mountains above the snow line, and the Arctic. The U.N. fields a large force to eliminate them. Iceland remains completely zombified, as its chilly weather and lack of military made it the most vulnerable country to the undead. Following a religious revolution sparked by rampant suicide within the Russian army during the war, Russia has become an expansionist theonomy intent on annexing the former Soviet republics, and has adopted a repopulation program under which the nation's few remaining fertile women are used as state broodmares.

North Korea remains quarantined as its entire population mysteriously vanished at the beginning of the pandemic, presumed to have fled into vast underground fallout shelters while remaining ignorant to the end of the zombie threat. Fears the North Korean population is now zombified have so far prevented reunification with South Korea. Cuba, influenced by a tide of American refugees, has become a capitalist democracy following multiple riots and Fidel Castro relinquishing his power, now boasting the world's largest Gross domestic product. Tibet has gained independence from China and hosts Lhasa as the world's most populous city. China has democratized following the loss of a large percentage of its population, followed by a civil war that deposed the Chinese Communist Party. Several new and unnamed countries have emerged due to wartime governments expelling convicts into infested zones, with many of these criminals surviving and going on to establish their own independent "fiefdoms".

The overall quality of human life has diminished, including shorter life expectancy, limited access to running water and electricity, and the resurgence of illnesses such as the Spanish flu. Many animals have gone extinct due to overhunting, pollution, or being killed by the undead. Fossil fuels are scarce, with petroleum from the Middle East becoming practically non-existent after Saudi Arabia destroyed its oil reserves for unknown reasons during the war. Sailboats have returned as the most common nautical vessels. Nevertheless, the majority of those who have survived have hope for the future, knowing humanity faced the brink of extinction and won.

== Development ==
Brooks designed World War Z to follow the "laws" set up in his earlier work, The Zombie Survival Guide (2003), and explained that the guide may exist in the novel's fictional universe. The zombies of The Zombie Survival Guide are human corpses reanimated by an incurable virus with a one hundred percent infection and mortality rate. They are devoid of intelligence, desire solely to consume living flesh, both human and animal, and cannot be killed unless the brain is destroyed. The blood of the undead has coagulated, causing it to appear as a black, sludge-like substance.

Decomposition will eventually destroy a zombie, but this process takes longer than for an uninfected body and can be slowed even further by cold weather. Zombies are also somehow capable of functioning after thawing, and are unaffected by the extreme pressures of the ocean floor. Although zombies do not tire and are as strong as the humans they infect (though they appear to be slightly stronger due to lack of normal restraint), they are slow in their movement and incapable of planning or cooperation in their attacks, though zombies can hear and are attracted by the moans of other zombies, potentially creating a "chain swarm".

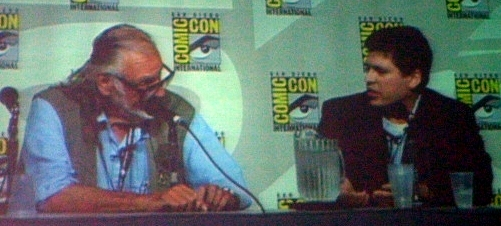
Max Brooks (right) with George A. Romero at the 2007 San Diego Comic-Con

Brooks discussed the cultural influences on the novel. He claimed inspiration from "The Good War": An Oral History of World War Two (1984) by Studs Terkel, stating: "[Terkel's book is] an oral history of World War II. I read it when I was a teenager and it's sat with me ever since. When I sat down to write World War Z: An Oral History of the Zombie War, I wanted it to be in the vein of an oral history." Brooks also cited renowned zombie film director George A. Romero as an influence and criticized the Return of the Living Dead films: "They cheapen zombies, make them silly and campy. They've done for the living dead what the old Batman TV show did for the Dark Knight." Brooks acknowledged making several references to popular culture in the novel, including one to the alien robot franchise Transformers, but declined to identify the others so that readers could discover them independently.

Brooks conducted copious research while writing World War Z. The technology, politics, economics, culture, and military tactics were based on a variety of reference books and consultations with expert sources.

== Analysis ==
=== Social commentary ===
Reviewers have noted that Brooks uses World War Z as a platform to criticize government ineptitude, corporate corruption, and human short-sightedness. At one point in the book, a Palestinian refugee living in Kuwait City refuses to believe the dead are rising, fearing it is a trick by the Israeli government. Many American characters blame the United States' inability to counter the zombie threat on low confidence in their government and a general exhaustion over conflict due to recent "brushfire wars."

Brooks further shows his particular dislike of government bureaucracy by having government figures in the novel attempt to justify lying about the zombie outbreak to avoid widespread panic, while at the same time failing to develop a solution for fear of arousing public ire. He has also criticized U.S. isolationism:

I love my country enough to admit that one of our national flaws is isolationism. I wanted to combat that in World War Z and maybe give my fellow Americans a window into the political and cultural workings of other nations. Yes, in World War Z some nations come out as winners and some as losers, but isn't that the case in real life as well? I wanted to base my stories on the historical actions of the countries in question, and if it offends some individuals, then maybe they should reexamine their own nation's history.

=== Themes ===
==== Survivalism ====
Survivalism and disaster preparation are prevalent themes in the novel. Several interviews, particularly those from the United States, focus on policy changes designed to fundamentally restructure the country to properly survive and combat the pandemic. A new federal executive department known as the Department of Strategic Resources (DeStRes) is formed, led by the former Chair of the Federal Reserve, dedicated to reorganizing the country's limited resources and restarting the economy. It is mentioned that a weakness of the pre-war U.S. was its post-industrial society, with white-collar workers like CEOs suddenly becoming classified as unskilled labor, and considered significantly less valuable assets than blue-collar workers like plumbers.

The effects of the pandemic on the wealthy versus lower economic classes is explored—one interview is told from the perspective of a mercenary hired to protect a wealthy man and his mansion in Long Island, New York, which was fortified and seemingly disaster-proofed at the beginning of the Great Panic. The client populates his mansion with other wealthy celebrities and their armies of personal assistants, and installs cameras in each room to broadcast a live feed of their amenities to the rest of the world. This backfires when a crowd of terrified, desperate civilians storms the compound and sparks a mass slaughter.

Throughout the novel, characters demonstrate the physical and mental requirements needed to survive a disaster—a soldier in the U.S. Army describes a condition he terms "Z-shock" that causes people to suffer potentially deadly psychological episodes induced by the extreme stress of battling the undead. To treat this, units of "combat shrinks" are formed with the purpose of monitoring soldiers for signs of Z-shock and removing them from the battlefield when necessary. On the American homefront, a former Hollywood director creates propaganda films designed to inspire hope in the civilian populace, who are being afflicted by a mysterious, stress-related condition known as "Asymptomatic Demise Syndrome" that causes thousands to die in their sleep. Brooks described the large amount of research needed to find optimal methods for fighting a worldwide zombie outbreak. He also pointed out that the U.S. likes the zombie genre because it believes that it can survive anything with the right "tools and talent."

==== Fear and uncertainty ====
Brooks considers the theme of uncertainty central to the zombie genre. He believes that zombies allow people to deal with their own anxiety about the end of the world. Brooks has expressed a deep fear of zombies:

They scare me more than any other fictional creature out there because they break all the rules. Werewolves and vampires and mummies and giant sharks, you have to go look for them. My attitude is if you go looking for them, no sympathy. But zombies come to you. Zombies don't act like a predator; they act like a virus, and that is the core of my terror. A predator is intelligent by nature and knows not to overhunt its feeding ground. A virus will just continue to spread, infect and consume, no matter what happens. It's the mindlessness behind it.

This mindlessness is connected to the context in which Brooks was writing. He declared: "at this point we're pretty much living in an irrational time", full of human suffering and lacking reason or logic. When asked in a subsequent interview about how he would compare terrorists with zombies, Brooks said:

The lack of rational thought has always scared me when it came to zombies, the idea that there is no middle ground, no room for negotiation. That has always terrified me. Of course, that applies to terrorists, but it can also apply to a hurricane, or flu pandemic, or the potential earthquake that I grew up with living in L.A. Any kind of mindless extremism scares me, and we're living in some pretty extreme times.

During an appearance on George Stroumboulopoulos Tonight, Brooks's friend and contemporary novelist Chuck Palahniuk revealed that a major influence on World War Z was the deterioration and death via cancer of Brooks's mother, Anne Bancroft.

== Reception ==
Reviews for the novel have been generally positive. Gilbert Cruz of Entertainment Weekly gave the novel an "A" rating, commenting that the novel shared with great zombie stories the use of a central metaphor, describing it as "an addictively readable oral history." Steven H Silver identified Brooks's international focus as the novel's greatest strength and commented favorably on Brooks's ability to create an appreciation for the work needed to combat a global zombie outbreak. Silver's only complaint was with "Good-Byes", the final chapter, in which characters get a chance to give a final closing statement; Silver felt that it was not always apparent who the sundry, undifferentiated characters were.

The Eagle described the book as being "unlike any other zombie tale" as it is "sufficiently terrifying for most readers, and not always in a blood-and-guts way, either." Keith Phipps of The A.V. Club stated that the format of the novel makes it difficult for it to develop momentum, but found the novel's individual episodes gripping. Patrick Daily of the Chicago Reader said the novel transcends the "silliness" of The Zombie Survival Guide by "touching on deeper, more somber aspects of the human condition." In his review for Time Out Chicago, Pete Coco declared that "[b]ending horror to the form of alternative history would have been novel in and of itself. Doing so in the mode of Studs Terkel might constitute brilliance."

Ron Currie Jr. named World War Z one of his favorite apocalyptic novels and praised Brooks for illustrating "the tacit agreement between writer and reader that is essential to the success of stories about the end of the world ... [both] agree to pretend that this is not fiction, that in fact the horrific tales of a war between humans and zombies are based in reality." Drew Taylor of the Fairfield County Weekly credited World War Z with making zombies more popular in mainstream society.

The hardcover version of World War Z spent four weeks on The New York Times Best Seller list, peaking at number nine. By November 2011, according to Publishers Weekly, World War Z had sold one million copies in all formats.

== Audiobook ==
Random House published an abridged audiobook (5 hours 59 minutes) in 2007, directed by John McElroy and produced by Dan Zitt, with sound editing by Charles De Montebello. The book is read by Brooks but includes other actors taking on the roles of the many individual characters who are interviewed in the novel. Brooks's previous career in voice acting and voice-over work meant he could recommend a large number of the cast members.

On May 14, 2013, Random House Audio released a lengthier (12 hours 9 minutes) audiobook titled World War Z: The Complete Edition (Movie Tie-in Edition): An Oral History of the Zombie War. It contains the entirety of the original, abridged audiobook, as well as new recordings of each missing segment. Twenty additional actors read the added segments.

A separate, additional audiobook containing only the new recordings not found in the original abridged audiobook was released simultaneously as World War Z: The Lost Files: A Companion to the Abridged Edition. Its length is 6 hours 13 minutes.

=== Cast ===
- Max Brooks as the Interviewer, explicitly identified by name as Max Brooks in the audiobook, an agent of the United Nations Postwar Commission and implied to be the author of the Civilian Survival Guide.
- Steve Park as Kwang Jingshu, a Chinese physician.
- Frank Kamai as Nury Televadi, a smuggler and human trafficker.
- Nathan Fillion as Stanley MacDonald*, a former soldier in the 3rd Battalion Princess Patricia's Canadian Light Infantry.
- Paul Sorvino as Fernando Oliveira*, a Brazilian former surgeon.
- Adetokumboh M'Cormack as Jacob Nyathi*, a South African civilian who survived the first major public outbreak in Cape Town.
- Carl Reiner as Jurgen Warmbrunn, a Mossad agent who helped write the Warmbrunn-Knight Report, the first formal document to recommend countermeasures against the undead.
- Waleed Zuaiter as Saladin Kader, a former Palestinian refugee who moved to Israel just before the start of the Great Panic.
- Jay O. Sanders as Bob Archer, the Director of the Central Intelligence Agency.
- Dennis Boutsikaris as Travis D'Ambrosia, the Supreme Allied Commander Europe and creator of the resource-to-kill ratio.
- Martin Scorsese as Breckinridge "Breck" Scott*, the billionaire creator of Phalanx who fled to Vostok Station at the start of the Great Panic.
- Simon Pegg as Grover Carlson*, the White House Chief of Staff for the unnamed President of the United States (heavily implied to be George W. Bush) during the Great Denial.
- Denise Crosby as Mary Jo Miller*, an American civilian who is the developer, chief architect, and first mayor of Troy, a town in Montana specifically designed to survive an attack by the undead.
- Bruce Boxleitner as Gavin Blaire*, an American blimp pilot.
- Ajay Naidu as Ajay Shah, an Indian former office manager who fled the undead by boarding a ship along the coast of Alang.
- Nicki Clyne as Sharon*, a now-adult feral child.
- Jeri Ryan as Maria Zhuganova*, a former soldier in the Russian army who has become a state broodmare.
- Henry Rollins as T. Sean Collins, an American mercenary who was hired to protect a fortified mansion in Long Island full of celebrities during the Great Panic.
- Maz Jobrani as Ahmed Farahnakian, an Iranian former pilot in the IRGC Air Force who accidentally helped spark the nuclear Iran–Pakistan War.
- Mark Hamill as Todd Wainio, a former soldier in the United States Army.
- Eamonn Walker as Paul Redeker, a controversial former intelligence consultant for the apartheid-era South African government who created the Redeker Plan. In the novel, he is initially referred to as Xolelwa Azania, with it being implied that Redeker suffered a kind psychotic episode during the war and abandoned his previous identity.
- Jürgen Prochnow as Philip Adler, a former tank commander in the German Army.
- David Ogden Stiers as Bohdan Taras Kondratiuk*, a former tank commander in the Ukrainian army.
- Michelle Kholos Brooks as Jesika Hendricks, an American-Canadian woman who survived the first winter after the Great Panic when she and her parents fled north.
- Kal Penn as Sardar Khan*, a former member of the Border Roads Organisation.
- Alan Alda as Arthur Sinclair Junior, the Chair of the Federal Reserve and former Secretary of Strategic Resources.
- Rob Reiner as "The Whacko", the Vice President of the United States throughout most of the war, heavily implied to be Howard Dean.
- Dean Edwards as Joe Muhammad, a paraplegic former member of a Neighborhood Security team, a volunteer quasi-military outfit intended to protect communities from zombie attacks during the war.
- Frank Darabont as Roy Elliot*, a former Hollywood director who used his talents to direct military propaganda films during the war, inspiring hope to combat Asymptomatic Demise Syndrome.
- Becky Ann Baker as Christina Eliopolis, a pre-war F-22 pilot in the United States Air Force who flew supply runs during the war.
- Eamonn Walker as David Allen Forbes, an English artist who participated in the defense of Windsor Castle.
- Parminder Nagra as Barati Palshigar*, an Indian broadcaster for Radio Free Earth who provided information to isolated civilians and fought misinformation during the war.
- Masi Oka as Kondo Tatsumi*, a former otaku who became a member of the Japan Self-Defense Forces "Shield Society" branch.
- Frank Kamai as Tomonaga Ijiro, a hibakusha who was permanently blinded by the atomic bombing of Nagasaki, going on to survive in the wilderness of Hokkaidō during the war and become the founder of the Shield Society.
- John Turturro as Seryosha Garcia Alvarez, a Cuban civilian.
- Ric Young as Admiral Xu Zhicai*, a former officer of a Type 094 submarine who fought in the Second Chinese Civil War on the side of the victorious rebels.
- Alfred Molina as Terry Knox*, the Australian former commander of the International Space Station throughout the war.
- John McElroy as Ernesto Olguin, a Chilean naval attaché who attended the Honolulu Conference.
- Common as Darnell Hackworth*, a former member of the U.S. Army K-9 Corps.
- F. Murray Abraham as Sergei Ryzhkov*, an Eastern Orthodox priest and former military chaplain who inadvertently sparked the religious revolution that transformed Russia into a theonomy.
- Brian Tee as Hyungchol Choi, the deputy director of the NIS; and Michael Choi*, a diver in the United States Navy Deep Submergence Combat Corps.
- René Auberjonois as Andre Renard*, a former soldier in the French Army who helped clear the Parisian catacombs of thousands of reanimated refugees.

* The Complete Edition

=== Reception ===
In her review of the audiobook for Strange Horizons, Siobhan Carroll called the story "gripping" and found the listening experience evocative of Orson Welles's famous radio narration of The War of the Worlds, broadcast October 30, 1938. Carroll had mixed opinions on the voice acting, commending it as "solid and understated, mercifully free of 'special effects' and 'scenery chewing' overall", but lamenting what she perceived as undue cheeriness on the part of Max Brooks and inauthenticity in Steve Park's Chinese accent.

Publishers Weekly also criticized Brooks's narration, but found that the rest of the "all-star cast deliver their parts with such fervor and intensity that listeners cannot help but empathize with these characters". In an article in Slate concerning the mistakes producers make on publishing audiobooks, Nate DiMeo used World War Z as an example of dramatizations whose full casts contributed to making them "great listens" and described the book as a "smarter-than-it-has-any-right-to-be zombie novel". The World War Z audiobook won the 2007 Audie Award for Multi-Voiced Performance and was nominated for Audiobook of the Year.

== Film adaptation ==
In June 2006, Paramount Studios secured the film rights for World War Z for Brad Pitt's production company, Plan B Entertainment, to produce. The screenplay was written by J. Michael Straczynski, with Marc Forster directing and Pitt starring as the main character, UN employee Gerry Lane.

Straczynski's script was set aside, though his draft had led to the film being green-lit. Production was to begin at the start of 2009, but was delayed while the script was completely re-written by Matthew Michael Carnahan to set the film in the present – leaving behind much of the book's premise – to make it more of an action film. In a 2012 interview, Brooks stated the film now had nothing in common with the novel other than the title. Filming commenced mid-2011, and the film was released in June 2013.

== See also ==
- List of zombie novels
- Midway Studios Newcastle, who worked on a cancelled video game adaptation of the book in 2008
