= The Zombie Survival Guide =

2003 fictional survival manual by Max Brooks

- Author: Max Brooks
- Cover artist: Max Werner
- Language: English
- Subject: Zombies
- Genre: Humor, Horror, Informative
- Publisher: Three Rivers Press
- Publication date: September 16, 2003
- Publication place: United States
- Media type: Print (Paperback), Ebook
- Pages: 272
- ISBN: 1-4000-4962-8
- OCLC: 51251720
- Followed by: World War Z

The Zombie Survival Guide is the first book written by American author Max Brooks, published in 2003. It is a fictional survival manual about zombies, containing information about zombie physiology and behavior, defense strategies and tactics, and includes case studies of possible zombie outbreaks throughout history. Despite its fictional subject matter, the book also includes practical information on disaster preparedness, generally.

Brooks' second book, World War Z (2006), is a follow-up to The Zombie Survival Guide, describing the events of a zombie apocalypse set in the same fictional universe.

== Contents ==
The book is divided into seven sections and an appendix. The first section contains information on the nature of "Solanum", a virus that causes zombification, as well as the physical attributes of zombies and a classification system for the severity of hypothetical zombie outbreaks. The next five sections cover practical survival skills and advice for coping with a zombie outbreak, including combat, defense preparations, methods of transportation, and adapting to a world overrun with zombies. The final section lists recorded zombie attacks throughout history.

The appendix is an "outbreak journal" for the reader to record incidents of possible zombie activity or outbreaks, including dates, locations, distance, specifics, and actions taken in response. It contains an example entry describing a suspicious news report about a family that had been murdered and partially eaten, and the preparedness steps taken by the entry's author as a result.

== Background ==
In a 2013 interview with The New York Times, Brooks said he felt his literary agent had marketed the book as a parody, saying "How I think my agent pitched them was like, Mel Brooks' son, who has just won an Emmy for 'S.N.L.,' wrote this unbelievable parody, tongue in cheek, he never breaks character. He's totally making fun of a zombie plague." However, he considered the book to be in the self-help genre, rather than humor, saying "I can't think of anything less funny than dying in a zombie attack."

Brooks' second book, World War Z, is a follow-up to The Zombie Survival Guide. Brooks has stated that the zombies in World War Z obey the same laws described in The Zombie Survival Guide, and suggested that they may exist in the same fictional universe.

== Reception ==
The book was generally well received as both informative and entertaining. However, some critics struggled to classify the book as either a satirical parody or a sincere exploration of the zombie genre. Recommending the book for zombie enthusiasts, Jake Halpern of NPR wrote "Most people assume that Brooks wrote this book as a joke, and perhaps he did — but I'm not laughing," and that "only a moron or an absolutely shameless zombie dork like myself would read these books and take every word at face value. But that's pretty much exactly what I do." Publishers Weekly called the book an "outrageous parody of a survival guide" which was amusing but "unnecessarily exhaustive". Pyramid described the book as akin to a "roleplaying game sourcebook", saying Brooks "uses a particular blend of dark humor and horror" and "treats the subject with such an earnest and serious tone".

== Adaptations ==
=== Comic book ===
A promotional tie-in comic book, The Zombie Survival Guide: Recorded Attacks, was released on October 6, 2008. It was written by Brooks and illustrated by Brazilian artist Ibraim Roberson.
